= Lusatia =

Historical region in Germany and Poland

Lusatia Łužica (Upper Sorbian) Łužyca (Lower Sorbian) Lausitz (German) Łużyce (Polish) Lužice (Czech)
- Historical region
- Coat of arms

- Coordinates: 51°32′42″N 14°43′34″E
- Countries: Germany; Poland
- Largest towns: Cottbus-Chóśebuz; Görlitz/Zgorzelec; Bautzen-Budyšin; Żary
- Time zone: UTC+1 (CET)
  - Summer (DST): UTC+2 (CEST)

Lusatia, (Note: English: /luːˈseɪʃ(i)ə/ loo-SAY-sh(ee-)ə; German: Lausitz [ˈlaʊzɪts]; Polish: Łużyce [wuˈʐɨt͡sɛ]; Upper Sorbian: Łužica [ˈwuʒitsa]; Lower Sorbian: Łužyca [ˈwuʒɨtsa]; Czech: Lužice [ˈluʒɪtsɛ].) otherwise known as Sorbia, is a region in Central Europe, territorially split between Germany and Poland. Lusatia stretches from the Bóbr and Kwisa rivers in the east to the Pulsnitz and Black Elster rivers in the west, and is located within the German states of Saxony and Brandenburg and the Polish voivodeships of Lower Silesia and Lubusz. Major rivers of Lusatia are the Spree and the Lusatian Neisse, which defines the border between Germany and Poland. The Lusatian Mountains of the Western Sudetes separate Lusatia from Bohemia (Czech Republic) in the south. Lusatia is traditionally divided into Upper Lusatia, the hilly southern part, and Lower Lusatia, the flat northern part.

The areas east and west along the Spree in the German part of Lusatia are home to the Slavic Sorbs, one of Germany's four officially recognized indigenous ethnic minorities. The Upper Sorbs inhabit Saxon Upper Lusatia, and the Lower Sorbs Brandenburgian Lower Lusatia. Upper and Lower Sorbian are spoken in the German parts of Upper and Lower Lusatia respectively, and the signage there is mostly bilingual.

Tacitus states that this entire region was part of Germania and that in and before the second century was populated by Germanic tribes. From the seventh century Slavs began migrating into this region. Subsequently it has been ruled variously by Germany, Poland, Bohemia, and Hungary.

The Lusatian Lake District is Europe's largest artificial lake district. The village of Herrnhut (Ochranow) is the seat of the Moravian Church. Muskau Park in Bad Muskau (Mužakow) and Łęknica is a UNESCO World Heritage Site. The Tropical Islands Resort, a large water park housed in a former airship hangar that is the biggest free-standing hall in the world, is located in the north of Lusatia. The closest international airport to Lusatia is Dresden Airport in Klotzsche (Kłóčow).

The largest Lusatian city is Cottbus (Chóśebuz), with nearly 100,000 inhabitants. Other notable towns are the former members of the Lusatian League: the German/Polish twin towns of Görlitz (Zhorjelc) and Zgorzelec, Bautzen (Budyšin), Zittau (Žitawa), Lubań, Kamenz (Kamjenc), and Löbau (Lubij)), as well as Żary, the German/Polish twin towns of Guben (Gubin) and Gubin, Hoyerswerda (Wojerecy), Senftenberg (Zły Komorow), Eisenhüttenstadt (Pśibrjog), and Spremberg (Grodk).

== Etymology ==
The name derives from the Sorbian word łužicy meaning "swamps" or "water-hole", Germanized as Lausitz. In early medieval sources, written in Latin, various forms were recorded, designating Slavic Lusatians and their region. Thus, Widukind's Chronicle (10th century) mentions Lusiki, while Thietmar's Chronicle (11th century) mentions Lusici or Lusizi, and also Luzici or Luidizi. In time, various forms, such as Lusatia, and other similar variations became common in Latin, and later entered into the English terminology.

== Geography ==
Lusatia comprises two both scenically and historically different parts: a hilly southern "upper" section and a "lower" region, which belongs to the North European Plain. The border between Upper and Lower Lusatia is roughly marked by the course of the Black Elster river at Senftenberg and its eastern continuation toward the Silesian town of Przewóz on the Lusatian Neisse. Neighbouring regions were Silesia in the east, Bohemia in the south, the Margraviate of Meissen, and the Duchy of Saxe-Wittenberg in the west as well as the Margraviate of Brandenburg (Mittelmark) in the north.

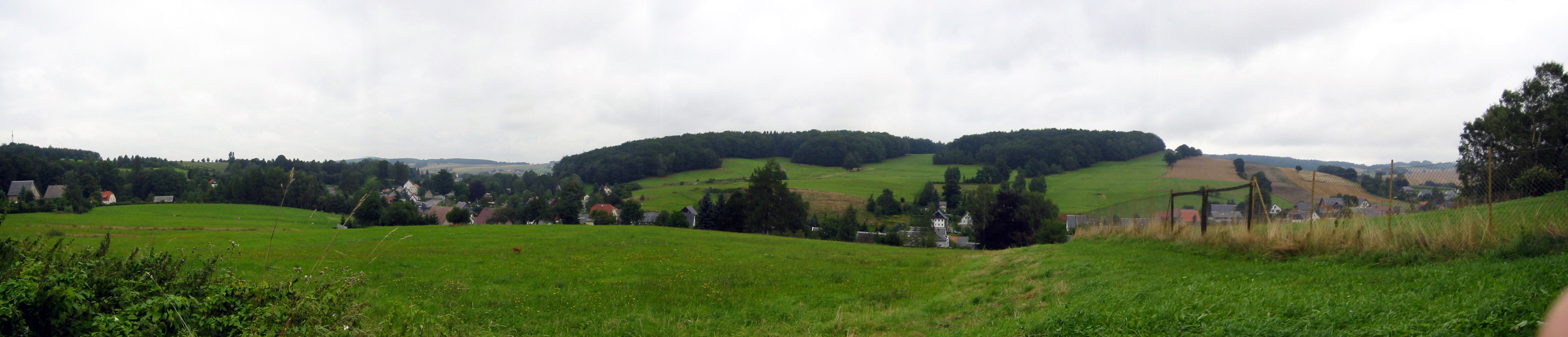
A view of the Lusatian Highlands

=== Upper Lusatia ===
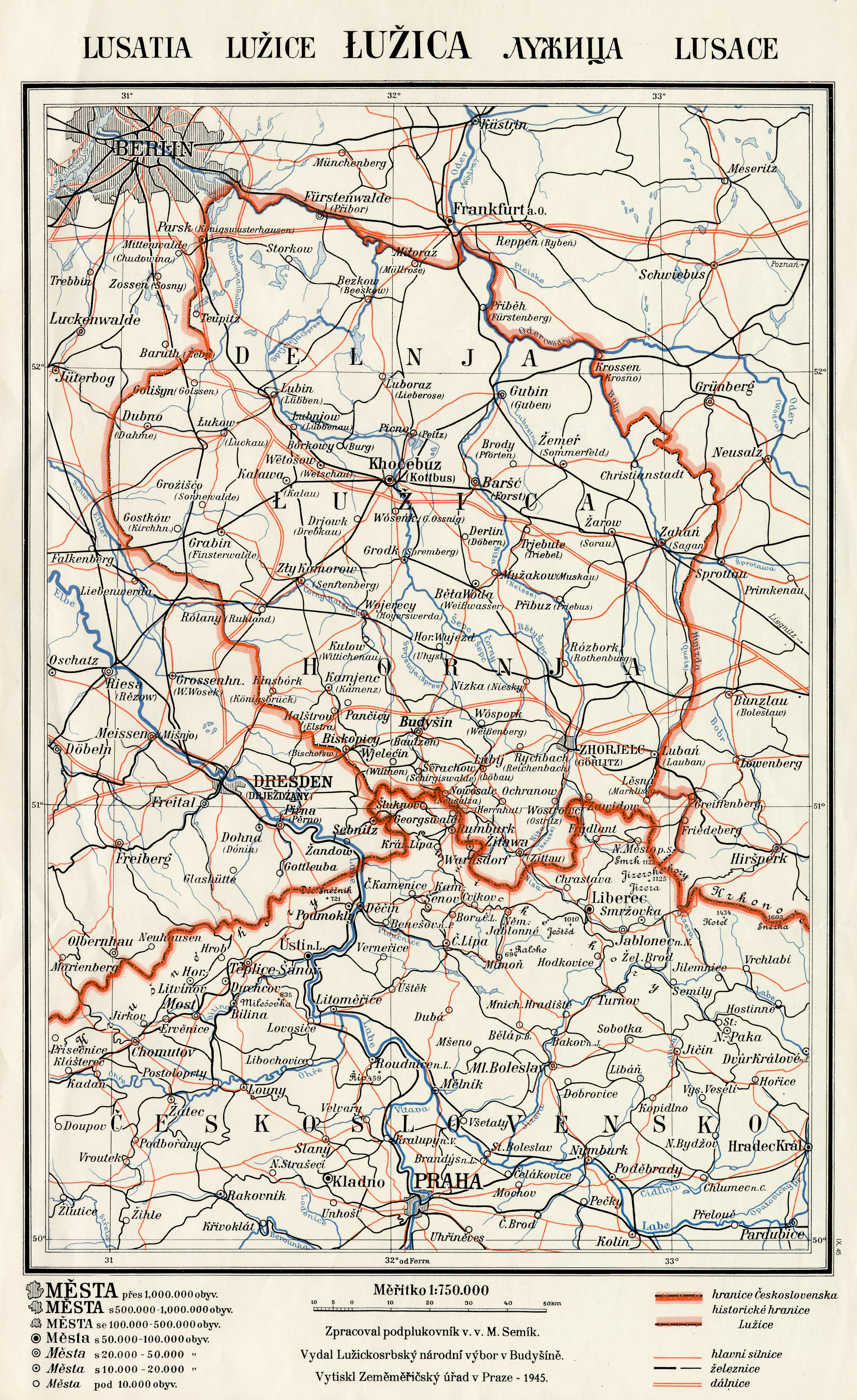
A 20th century map of Lusatia with Sorbian and German names

Upper Lusatia (Oberlausitz, Łużyce Górne or Hornja Łužica) is today part of the German states of Saxony (most of its territory) and Brandenburg (Tettau, Lindenau, Bärhaus, Frauendorf, Burkersdorf, Kroppen, Heinersdorf, Ruhland, Arnsdorf, Jannowitz, Hermsdorf, Lipsa, Biehlen, Schwarzbach, Guteborn, Niemtsch, Peickwitz, Hohenbocka, Grünewald, Sella and Hosena); part east of the Neisse River around Lubań now belongs to the Polish Lower Silesian voivodeship. It consists of hilly countryside rising in the South to the Lusatian Highlands near the Czech border, and then even higher to form the Zittau Hills, the small northern part of the Lusatian Mountains (Lužické hory/Lausitzer Gebirge) in the Czech Republic.

Upper Lusatia is characterized by fertile soil and undulating hills as well as by historic towns and cities such as Bautzen, Görlitz, Zittau, Löbau, Kamenz, Lubań, Bischofswerda, Herrnhut, Hoyerswerda, and Bad Muskau. Many villages in the very south of Upper Lusatia contain a typical attraction of the region, the so-called Umgebindehäuser, half-timbered-houses representing a combination of Franconian and Slavic style. Among those villages are Niedercunnersdorf, Obercunnersdorf, Wehrsdorf, Jonsdorf, Sohland an der Spree with Taubenheim, Oppach, Varnsdorf or Ebersbach.

=== Lower Lusatia ===
Most of the area belonging to the German state of Brandenburg today is called Lower Lusatia (Niederlausitz, Łużyce Dolne or Dolna Łužyca) and is characterized by forests and meadows. In the course of much of the 19th and the entire 20th century, it was shaped by the lignite industry and extensive open-pit mining. Important towns include Cottbus, Eisenhüttenstadt, Lübben, Lübbenau, Spremberg, Finsterwalde, Senftenberg (Zły Komorow), and Żary, which is now considered the capital of Polish Lusatia.

Between Upper and Lower Lusatia is a region called the Grenzwall, literally meaning "border dyke", although it is in fact a morainic ridge. In the Middle Ages this area had dense forests, so it represented a major obstacle to civilian and military traffic. Some of the region's villages were damaged or destroyed by the open-pit lignite mining industry during the DDR era. Some, now exhausted, former open-pit mines are now being converted into artificial lakes, with the hope of attracting holiday-makers, and the area is now being referred to as the Lusatian Lake District.

=== Lusatian capitals ===
As Lusatia is not, and never has been, a single administrative unit, Upper and Lower Lusatia have different, but in some respects similar, histories. The city of Cottbus is the largest in the region, and though it is recognized as the cultural capital of Lower Lusatia, it was a Brandenburg exclave since 1445. Historically, the administrative centres of Lower Lusatia were at Luckau and Lübben, while the historical capital of Upper Lusatia is Bautzen. Since 1945, when a small part of Lusatia east of the Oder–Neisse line was incorporated into Poland, Żary has been touted as the capital of Polish Lusatia.

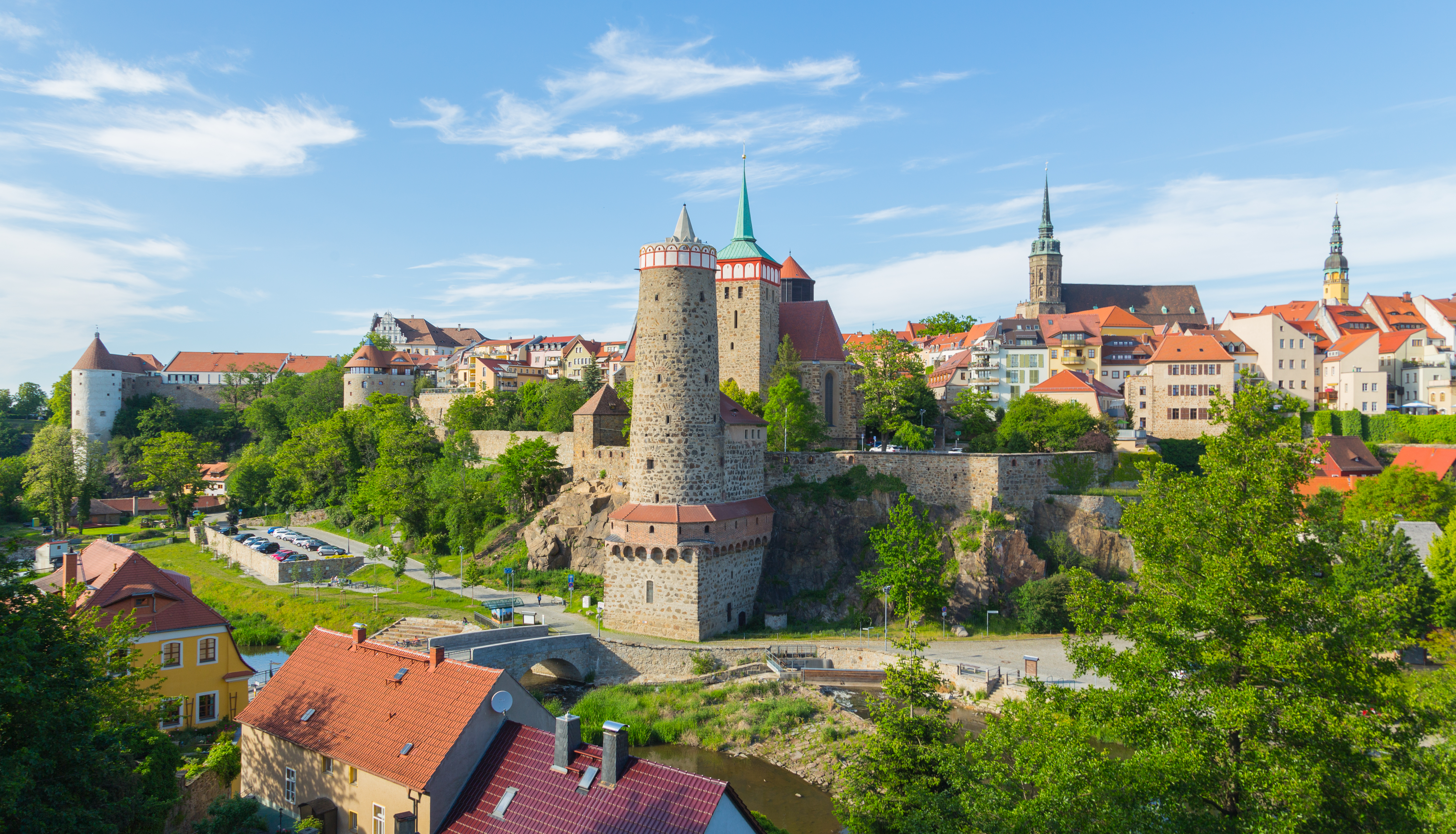
Bautzen (Budyšin), capital of Upper Lusatia

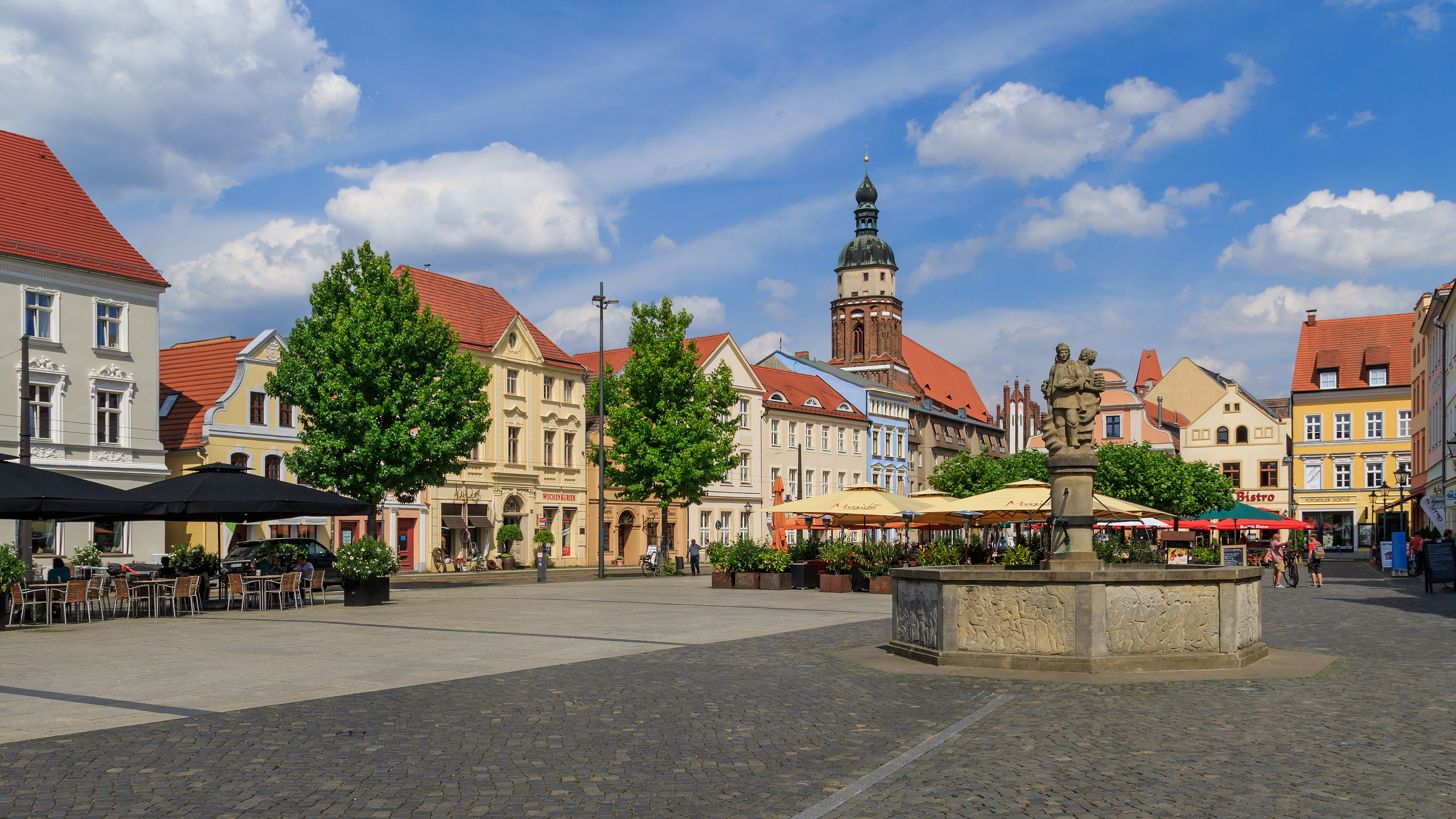
Cottbus (Chóśebuz), capital of Lower Lusatia

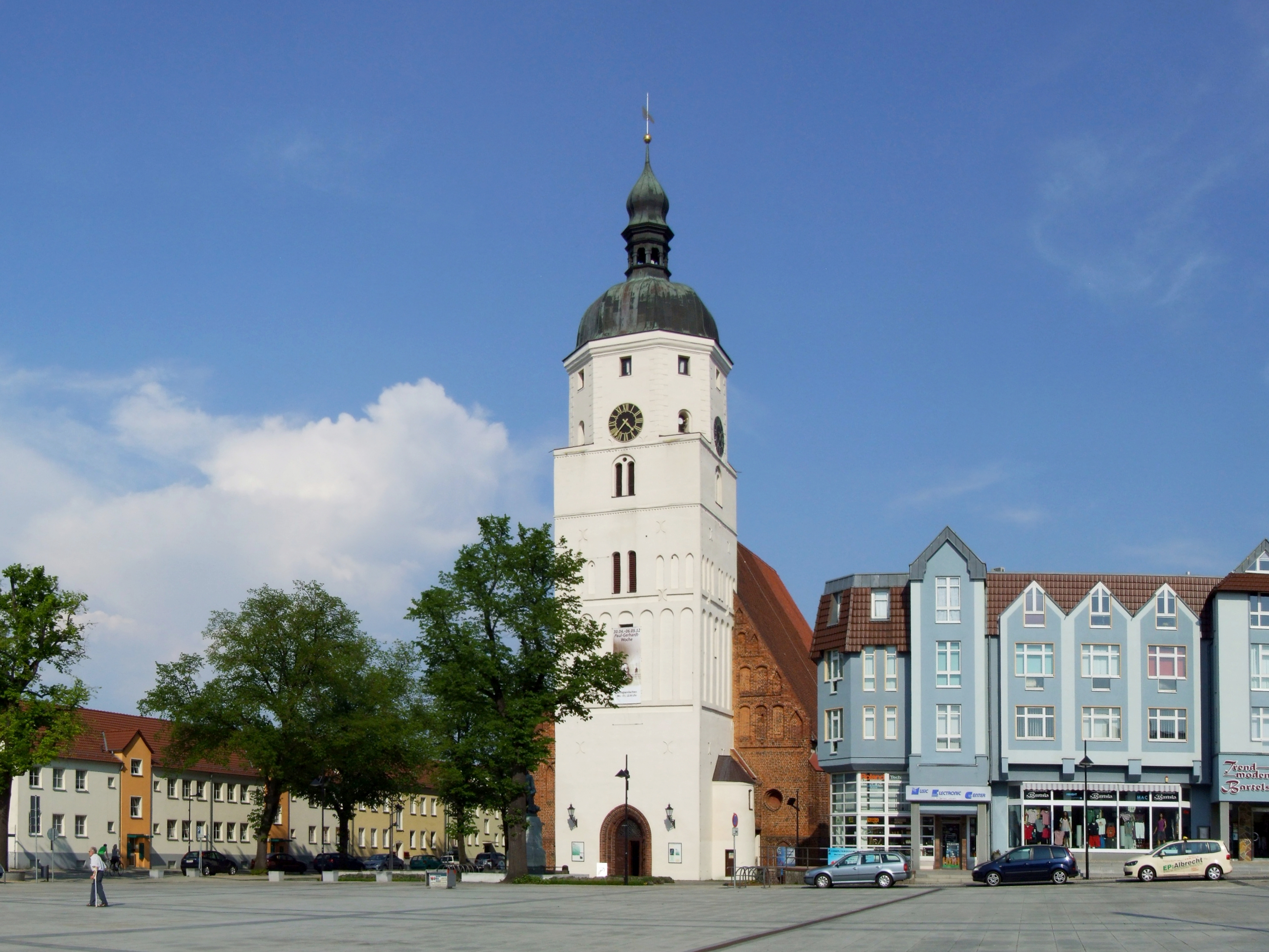
Lübben (Spreewald) (Lubin (Błota)), former capital of Lower Lusatia

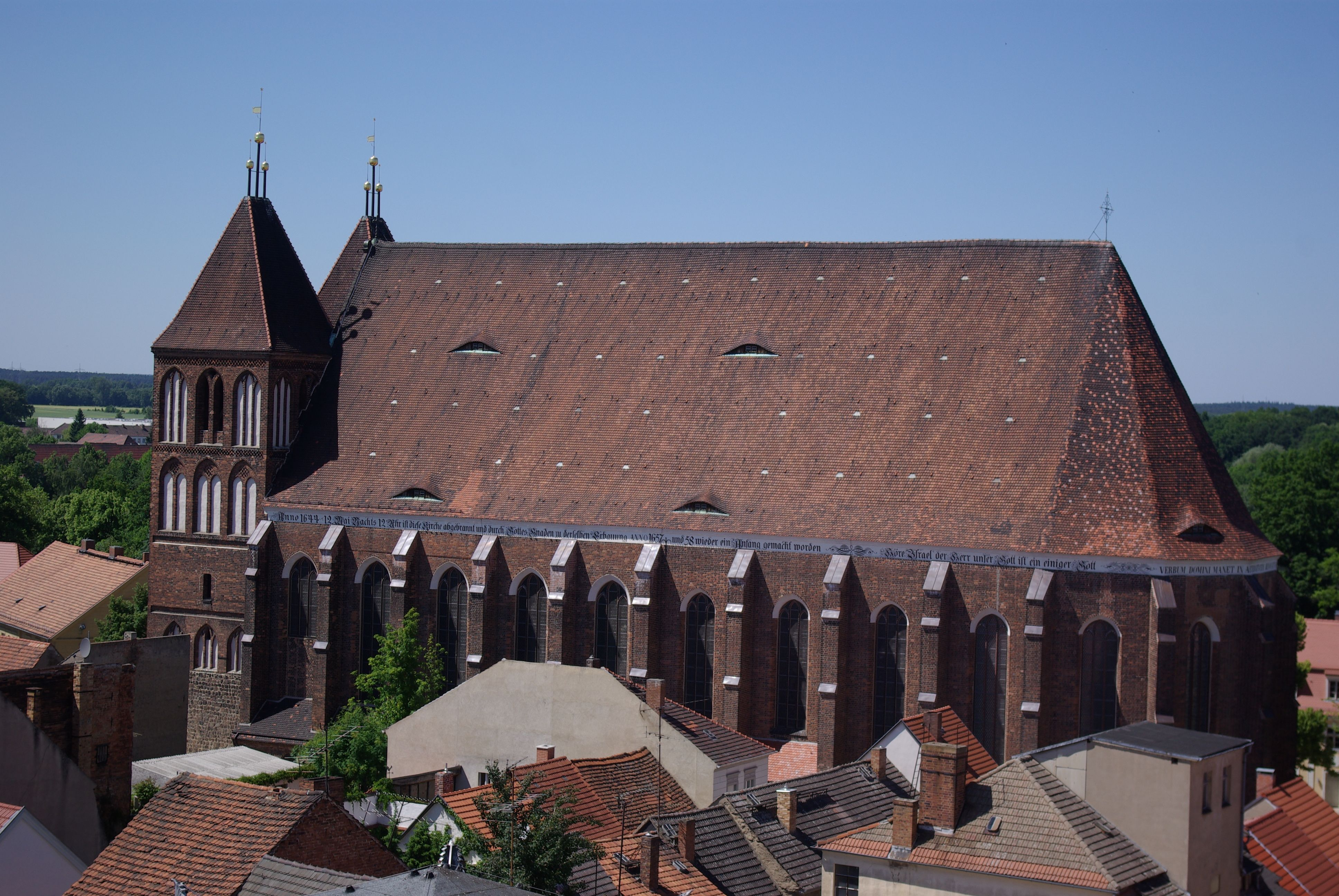
Luckau (Łuków), former capital of Lower Lusatia

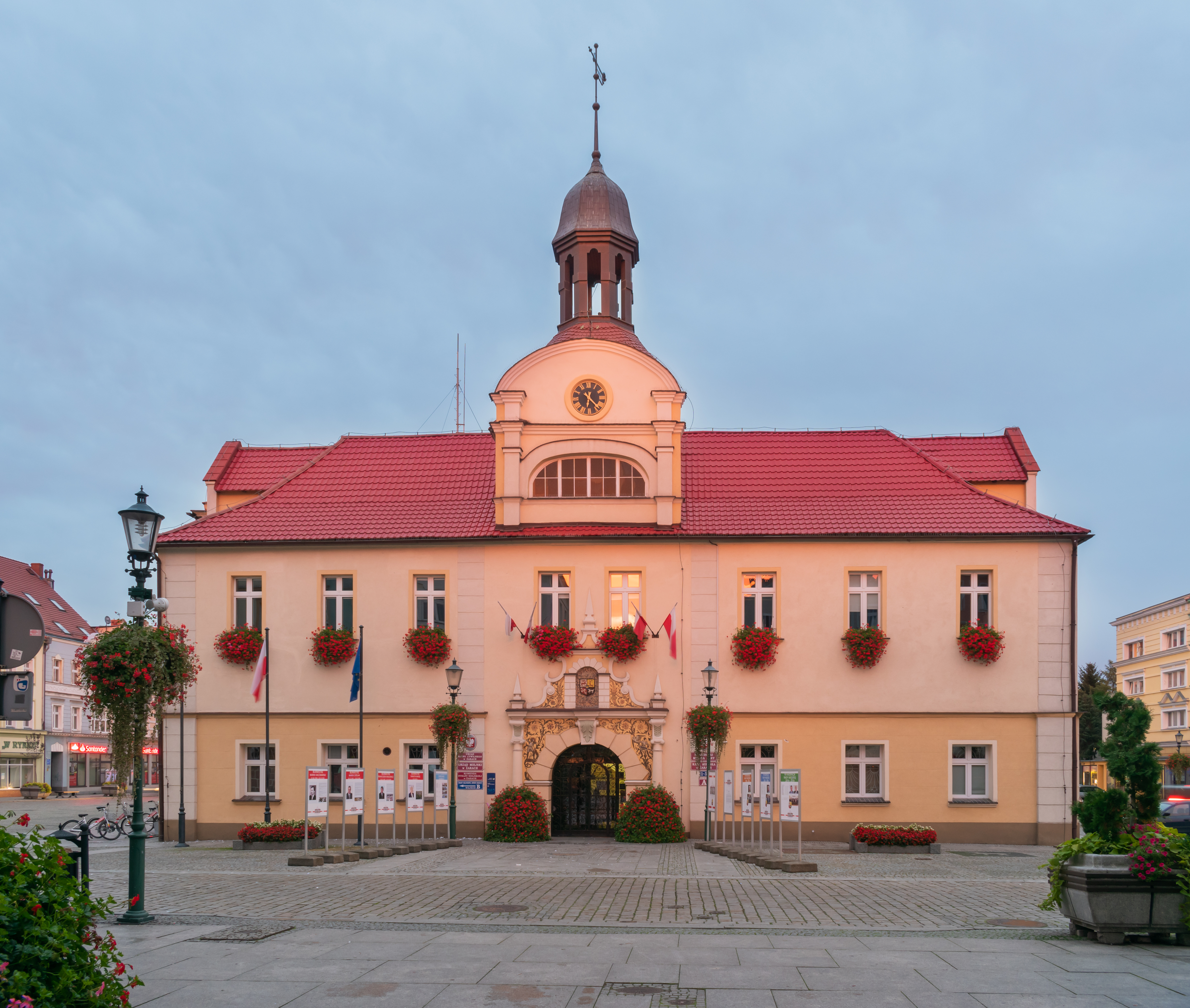
Żary, capital of Polish Lusatia

=== Lusatian Lake District ===
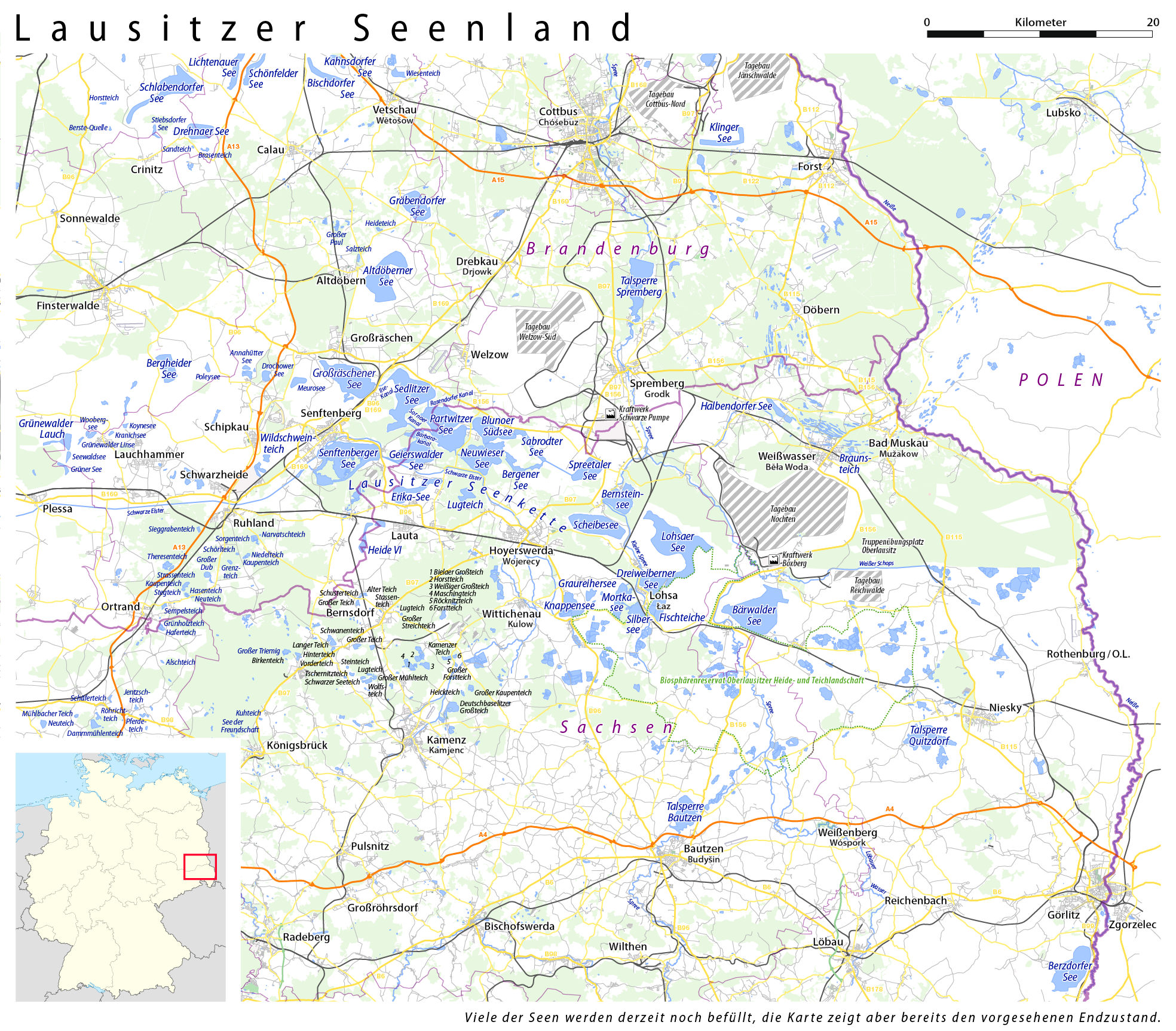

The Lusatian Lake District (German: Lausitzer Seenland, Lower Sorbian: Łužyska jazorina, Upper Sorbian: Łužiska jězorina) is an artificially created lake area. By the end of the 2020s, Europe's largest artificial water landscape and Germany's fourth-largest lake area are to be created by flooding disused brown coal mines in the Lusatian brown coal mining area. Some of the largest lakes are connected to each other as a chain of lakes by navigable canals.

The new lakeland is largely created from remaining holes from former brown coal opencast mines. These are flooded and converted into lakes. Some of the resulting lakes have already reached their final water level, others will not be completely flooded for a few years.

Other lakes are artificially dammed lakes. While the Quitzdorf Dam was created to provide enough process water for the Boxberg Power Station, the Spremberg Dam was primarily planned for flood protection in the lake district, but was also used for process water for power plants. The Bautzen Reservoir was also artificially created in order to be able to continuously supply the Boxberg Power Station with water.

The ponds of the Upper Lusatian Heath and Pond Landscape Biosphere Reserve, which are also located in the Lake District area, were partly created in the Middle Ages, but also during the GDR period for agricultural reasons, as the moor-rich land was restructured and made usable. These very shallow waters are mostly used for fish farming.

The ponds of the Muskau Arch are also located between the large opencast mining holes. They arose from faults in the terminal moraine of glaciers from the Ice Age, and partly through the mining of soil raw materials such as sand, clay and coal even before industrialization. In general, these ponds are not created intentionally by humans, but are filled with water due to a lack of drainage.

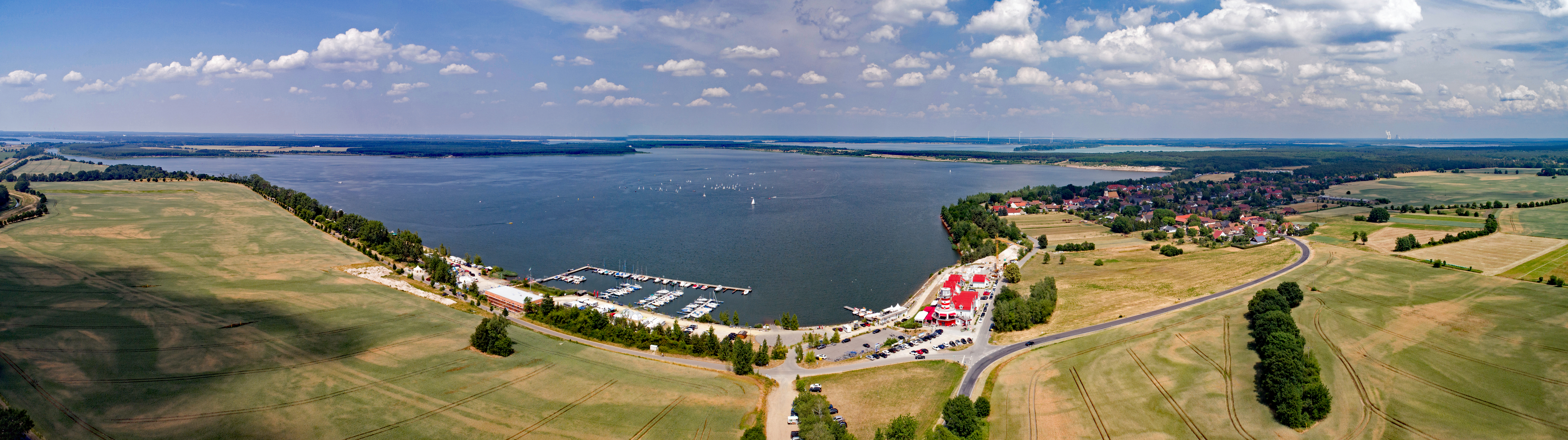
Geierswalder See (Lejnjanski jězor)

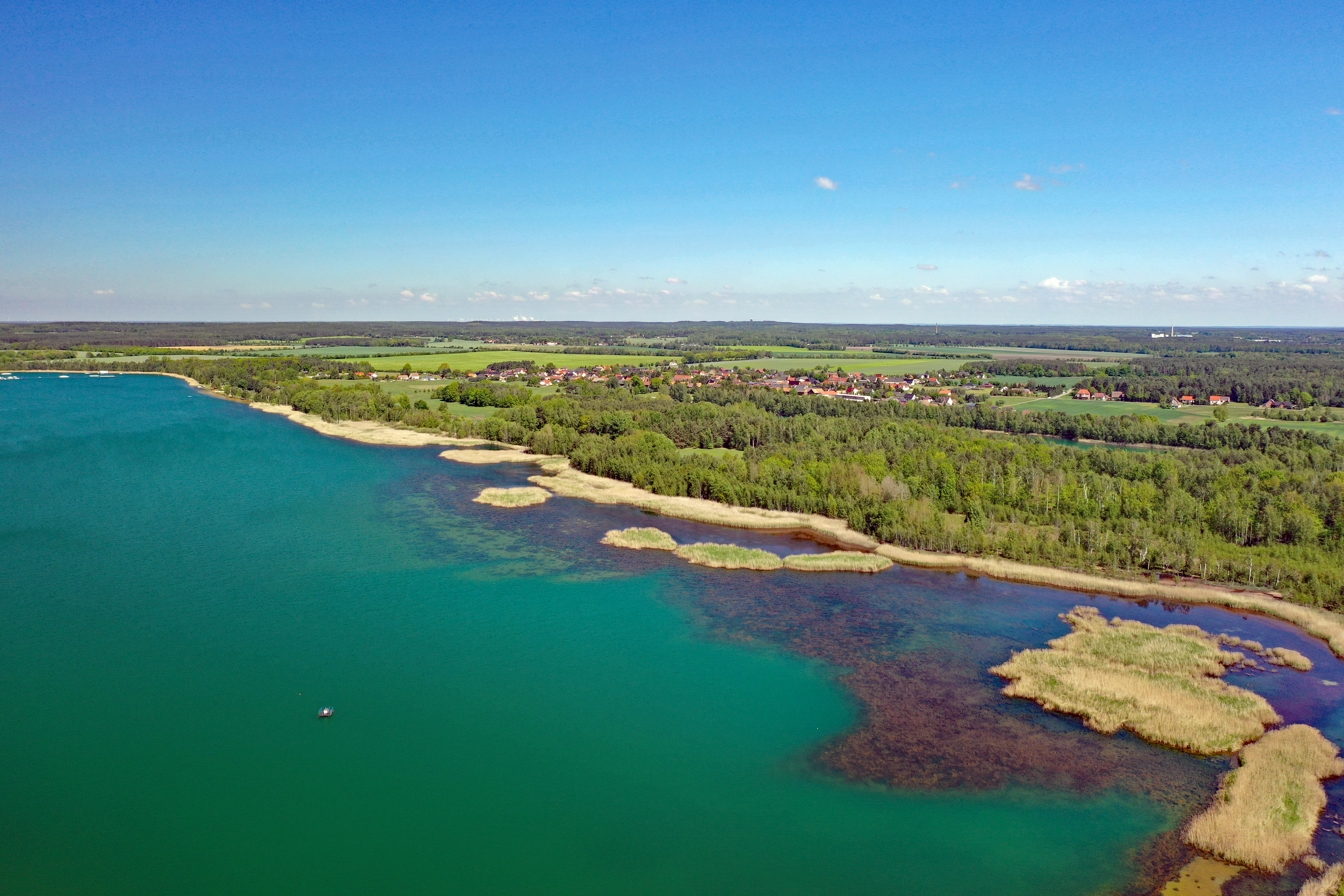
Halbendorfer See (Brězowski jězor)

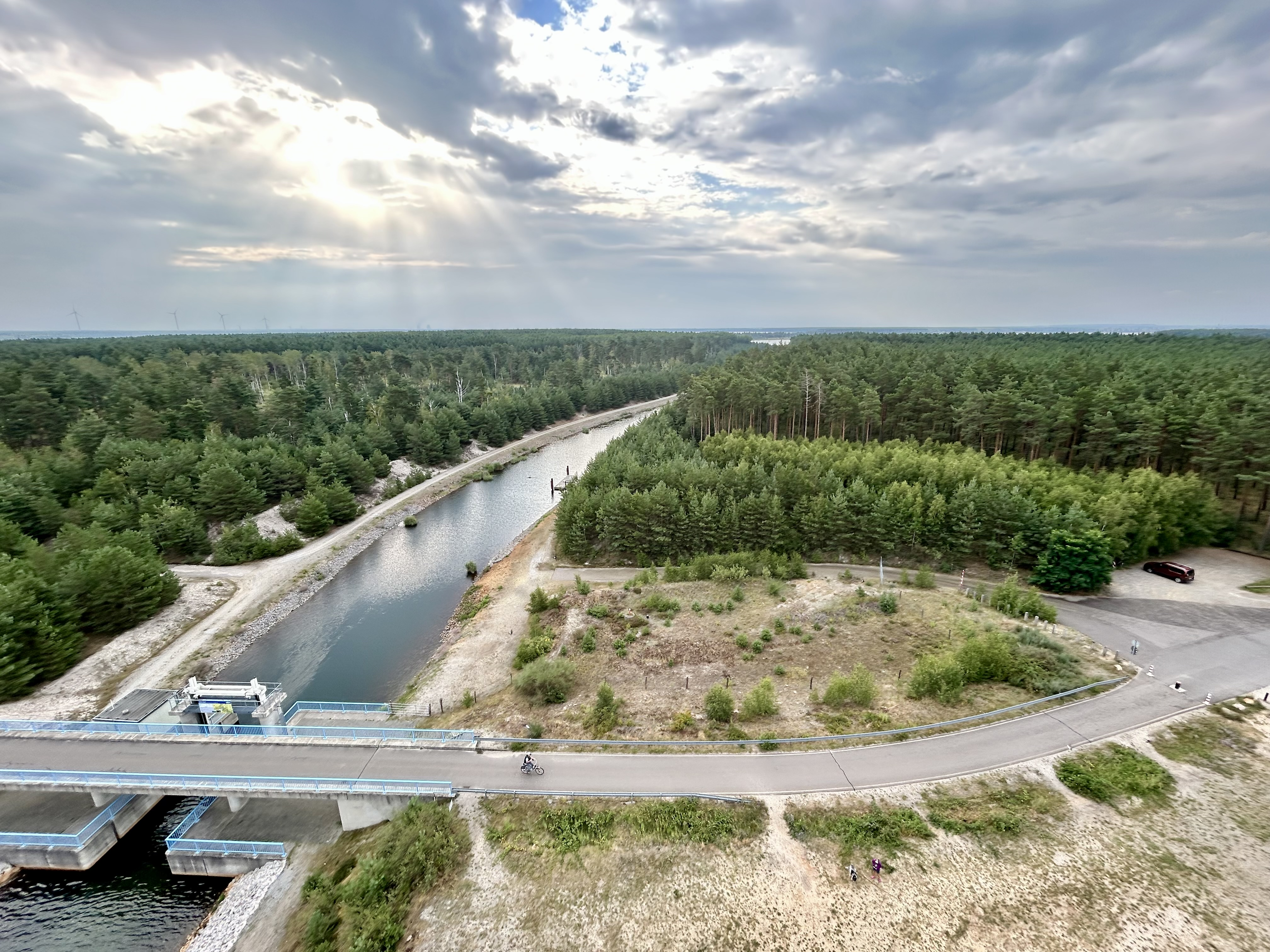
Sornoer Kanal (Žarnowski kanal) linking Geierswalder See to Sedlitzer See (Sedlišćański jazor)

=== Muskau Morainic Arch ===
The Muskau Morainic Arch is a terminal moraine formed during the Elster glaciation, which together with its immediate surroundings forms the "UNESCO Global Geopark Muskau Morainic Arch" (German: Muskauer Faltenbogen, Sorbian: Mužakowski Zahork, Polish: Łuk Mużakowa).

A glacier on the inland ice that was up to 500 m thick compressed the sand and brown coal layers in front of and below it over a length of more than 40 km to form a small-scale fold arch with a compression terminal moraine up to 180 m high and 700 m wide. The structure is currently preserved as a flat, undulating hill range and is almost unique in the world. The meltwater lake that subsequently emerged within the horseshoe was filled with clays.

Ice advances in the following cold periods eroded the higher parts of the terminal moraine. Due to oxidation and the associated loss of volume in the areas near the surface of the brown coal seams, furrows of 3 m to 5 m, a maximum of 20 m deep, 10 m to 30 m wide and up to several kilometers long were formed. Known as "Gieser" (from the Sorbian "jězor" for "lake"), they form long stretches of drainless ditches that are either filled with standing water or often peat-covered.

After already centuries of extraction of clay and sand, brown coal was mined in the area of the Muskau Arch in the 19th and 20th centuries, partly in pillar mining and partly in opencast mining. Due to the location of the mined seams, noticeably elongated lakes formed in the remaining holes north and east of Weißwasser after the end of mining.

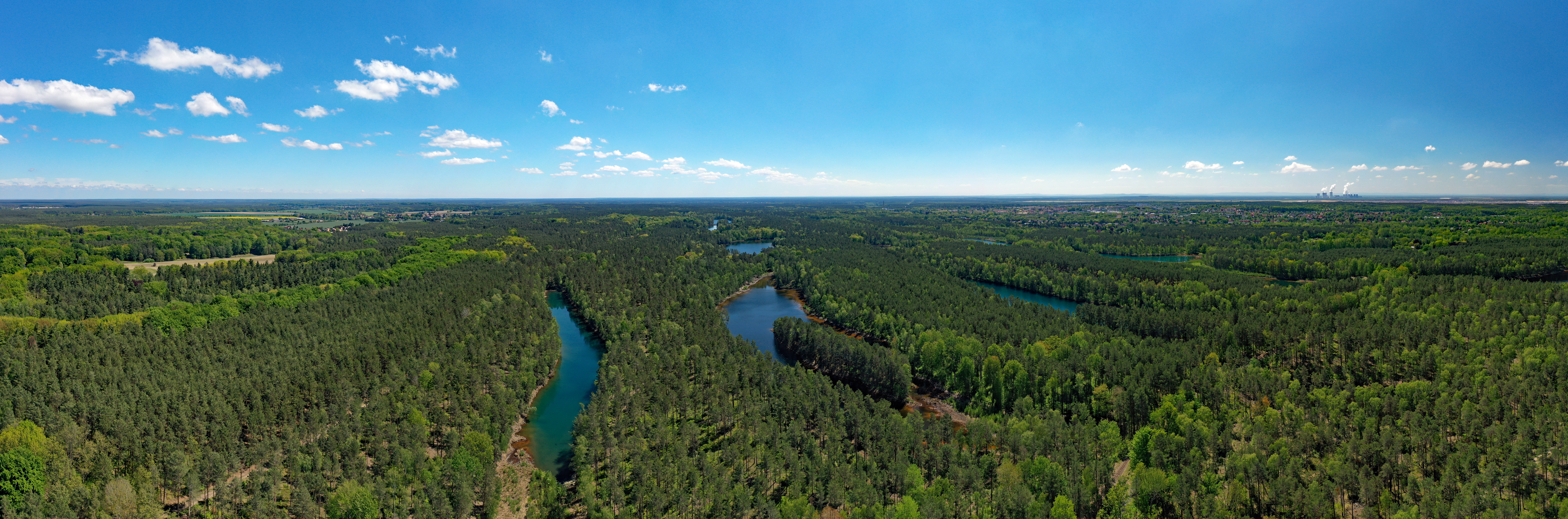
Gieser landscape between Weißwasser and Gablenz

=== Upper Lusatian Heath and Pond Landscape ===
Logo of the Upper Lusatian Heath and Pond Landscape Biosphere Reserve

The Upper Lusatian Heath and Pond Landscape (German: Oberlausitzer Heide- und Teichlandschaft, Upper Sorbian: Hornjołužiska hola a hatowa krajina) is the region richest in ponds in Germany, and together with the Lower Lusatian Pond Landscape forms the biggest pond landscape in Central Europe.

== History ==
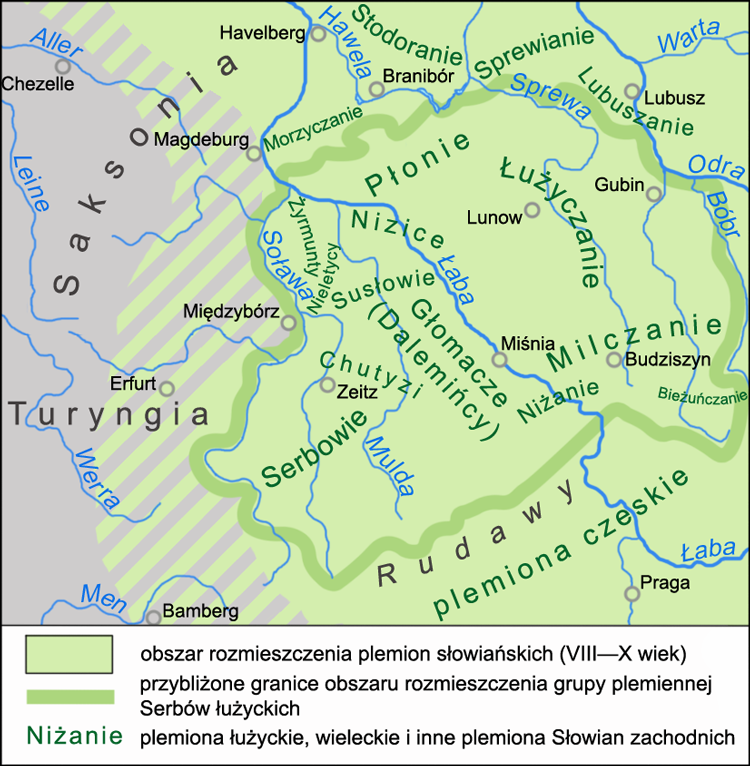
Lusatians (Łużyczanie) and other Sorbian tribes in the Early Middle Ages

=== Early history ===
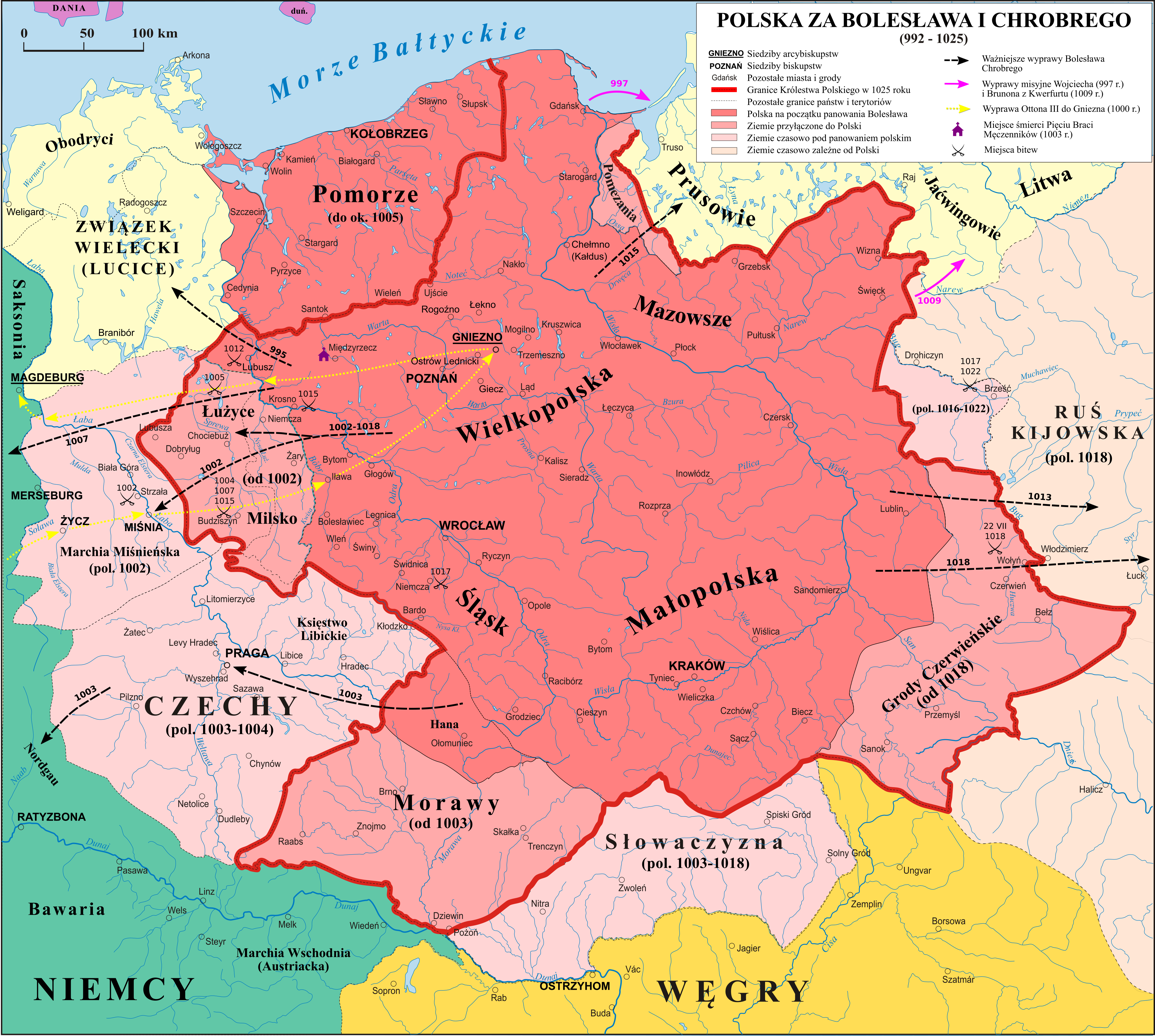
Poland under Bolesław I the Brave with Lusatia and marked battles of the German–Polish War (1003–1018)

According to the earliest records, the area of modern Lusatia was settled by culturally Celtic tribes. Later, around 100 BC, the Germanic Semnones settled in that area. By the end of the 6th century, a Polabian Slavic tribe known as the Lusatians (Lusici) settled permanently in the region that came to be known as Lusatia (later Lower Lusatia), while Milceni settled further to the south (later Upper Lusatia).

In the 10th century, the region came under the sphere of influence of the Kingdom of Germany, starting with the 928-934 eastern campaigns of king Henry the Fowler. By 963, the Lusatians and other Sorbian tribes were subdued and placed under the jurisdiction of Saxon margrave Gero I, within the Holy Roman Empire. Upon Geros's death in 965, his jurisdiction was divided, and the territory of today's Lower Lusatia was included into the newly created Saxon Eastern March, while the region of Milceni in today's Upper Lusatia was included into the March of Meissen. During the Slavic uprising of 983, that was centered in regions further to the north, German margraves maintained their jurisdictions over Lusatians and Milceni.

At the same time, the neighboring Poland raised claims to the Sorbian lands, including Lusatia. Upon the death of Emperor Otto III in 1002, Lusatia was lost to the Polish duke Boleslaw I the Brave, who captured the territories of both Luatians and Milceni, and those gains were acknowledged to him later that year by German king Henry II upon their meeting in Merseburg. In the 1018 Peace of Bautzen, Lusatia remained under Polish rule, but Germans and Poles continued to contest over the administration of the region. It was regained by Germans in a 1031-1032 campaign of emperor Conrad II, and placed again under the rule of local margraves. The old Lusatia was thus returned to the Saxon Eastern March, that came to be known also as the March of Lusatia, while the region of Milceni was placed again under the March of Meissen.

=== Bohemian rule ===
As margrave Egbert II of Meissen supported anti-king Rudolf of Rheinfelden during the Investiture Controversy, king Henry IV of Germany in 1076 awarded the Milceni lands in today's Upper Lusatia as a fief to the Bohemian duke Vratislaus II. After Emperor Frederick Barbarossa had elevated duke Vladislaus II to the rank of a King of Bohemia in 1158, the Milceni lands around Bautzen, in today's Upper Lusatia, evolved into one of Bohemian crown lands.

Around 1200, large numbers of German settlers came to Lusatia in the course of the Ostsiedlung, settling in the forested areas yet not inhabited by the Slavs. For centuries, from as early as the Middle Ages, trade flourished, and several important trade routes ran through Lusatia, connecting German states in the west, Poland in the east and Bohemia in the south. In 1319, the region was divided between the Kingdom of Bohemia and the Duchy of Jawor, the southwesternmost duchy of fragmented Piast-ruled Poland, while northernmost parts also passed to the Margraviate of Brandenburg in the following years.

In 1367, the Brandenburg elector Otto V of Wittelsbach sold the old (lower) Lusatia to emperor Charles IV who was also the king Bohemia, thereby including the March of Lusatia into the Bohemian crown lands.

In 1346, six Lusatian cities formed the Lusatian League to resist the constant attacks conducted by robber barons. The association later supported king Sigismund in the Hussite Wars leading to armed attacks and devastation. The cities were represented in the Upper Lusatian Landtag assembly, where they met with the fierce rivalry of the nobles. In 1469, during the war over the Bohemian crown, the region was captured by Matthias Corvinus, the King of Hungary who also became the King of Bohemia. In 1490, upon the reintegration of Bohemian Crown lands, it came under the rule of Jagiellonian kings of Bohemia.

By the end of the 15th century, terms Lower Lusatia and Upper Lusatia became common designations for northern and southern parts of the region. Both Lusatias, as lands of the Bohemian Crown, remained under Jagiellonian rule until 1526, when they were inherited by the House of Habsburg. Following the Lutheran reformation (1517), the greater part of Lusatia became Protestant except for the area between Bautzen, Kamenz and Hoyerswerda.

=== Saxon rule ===
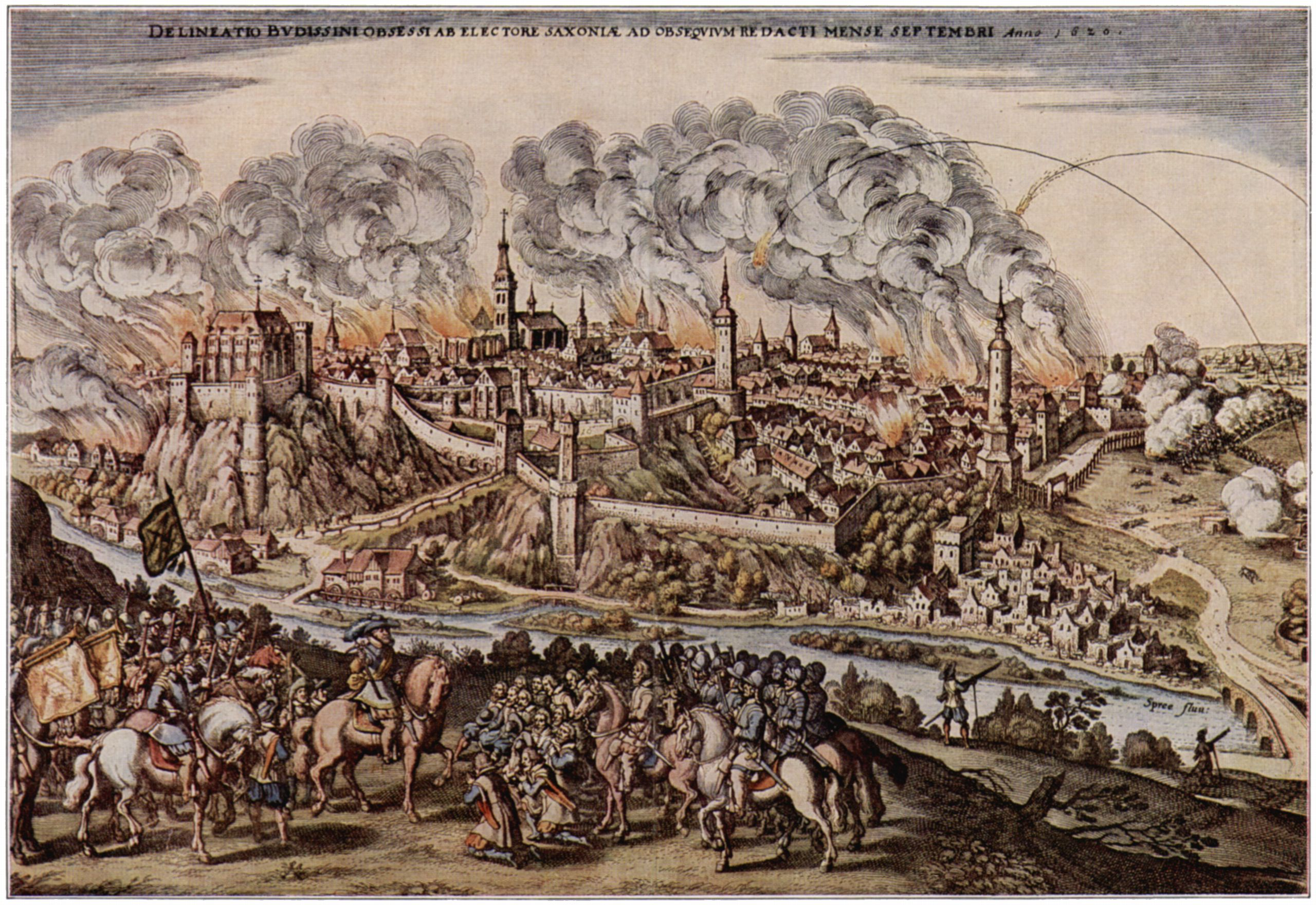
The siege and capture of Bautzen by John George I, Elector of Saxony, in September 1620

According to the 1635 Peace of Prague, most of Lusatia became a province of the Electorate of Saxony, except for the region around Cottbus possessed by Brandenburg. After the Saxon elector Augustus the Strong was elected king of Poland in 1697, Lusatia became strategically important as the elector-kings sought to create a land connection between their Saxon homelands and the Polish territories. Two main routes connecting Warsaw and Dresden ran through the region in the 18th century and Kings Augustus II the Strong and Augustus III of Poland often traveled the routes.

Polish dignitaries traveled through Lusatia on several occasions, and some Polish nobles owned estates in Lusatia. A distinct remnant of the region's ties to Poland are the 18th-century mileposts decorated with the coat of arms of the Polish–Lithuanian Commonwealth located in various towns in the region. Polish-Sorbian contacts increased in that period. With the Age of Enlightenment, the Sorbian national revival began and resistance to Germanization emerged.

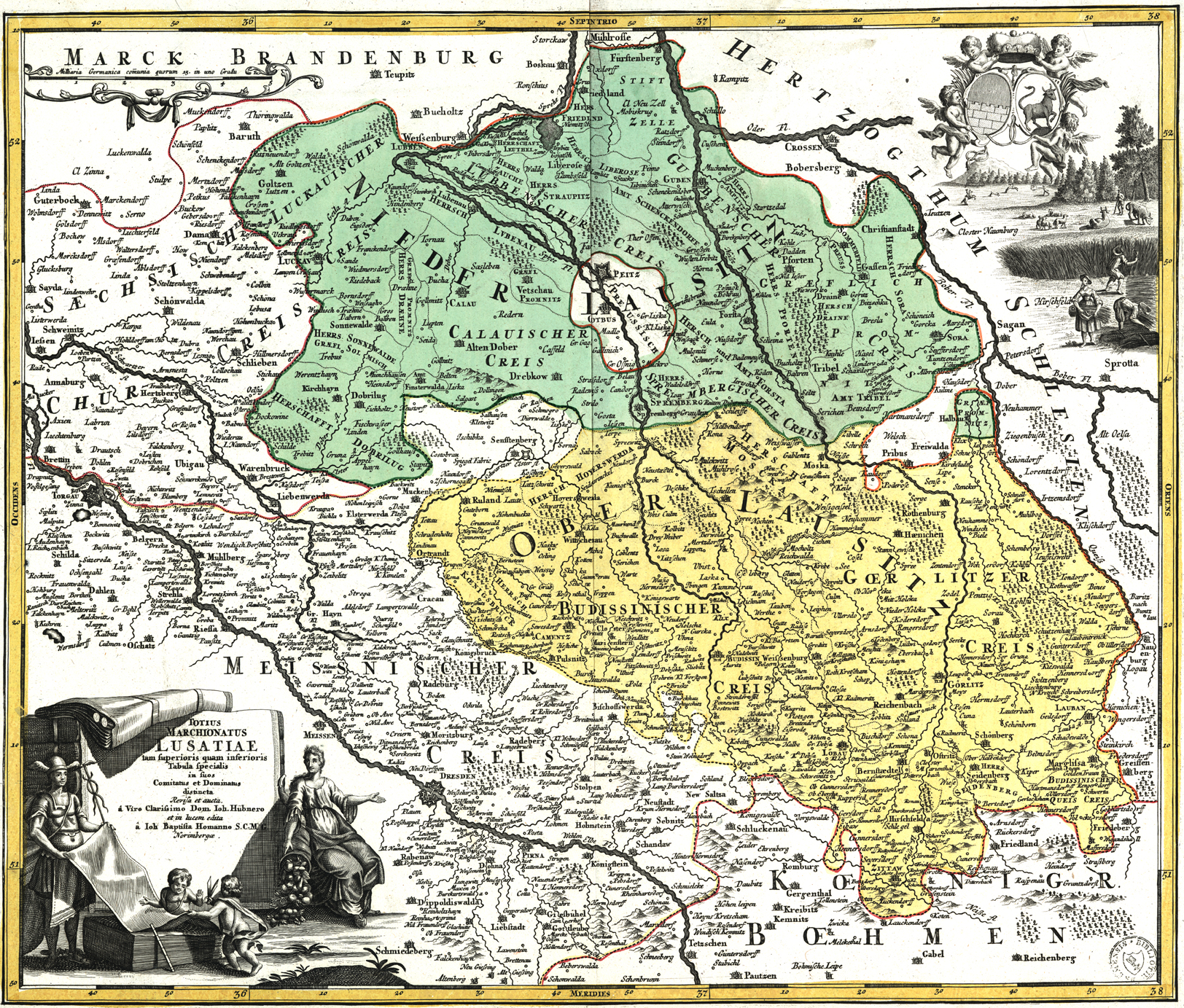
Map of the Lusatias by J.B. Homann, about 1715

Herrnhut, between Löbau and Zittau, founded in 1722 by religious refugees from Moravia on the estate of Count Nicolaus Zinzendorf became the starting point of the organized Protestant missionary movement in 1732 and missionaries went out from the Moravian Church in Herrnhut to all corners of the world to share the Gospel.

The newly established Kingdom of Saxony sided with Napoleon. Therefore, at the 1815 Congress of Vienna, Lusatia was divided, with Lower Lusatia and the northeastern part of Upper Lusatia around Hoyerswerda, Rothenburg, Görlitz, and Lauban awarded to Prussia. Only the southwestern part of Upper Lusatia, which included Löbau, Kamenz, Bautzen, and Zittau, remained part of Saxony.

=== Prussian rule ===
The Lusatians in Prussia demanded that their land become a distinct administrative unit, but Lower Lusatia was incorporated into the Province of Brandenburg, while the Upper Lusatian territories were attached to the Province of Silesia instead.

One of the main escape routes for insurgents of the unsuccessful Polish November Uprising from partitioned Poland to the Great Emigration led through Lübben and Luckau.

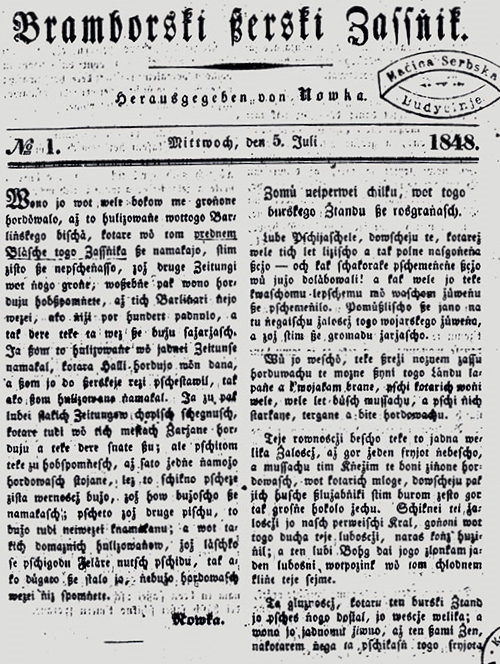
First issue of the Bramborski Serbski Casnik Sorbian newspaper, 1848

The 19th and early 20th centuries witnessed an era of cultural revival for Sorbs. The modern languages of Upper and Lower Lusatian (or Sorbian) emerged, national literature flourished, and many national organizations such as Maćica Serbska and Domowina were founded. There were also notable Polish communities in Lusatia, such as Klettwitz (Upper Sorbian: Klěśišća, Polish: Kletwice), inhabited in the 1930s by some 550 Poles.

During World War I, Germany operated two prisoner-of-war camps and a detention center for Russian, French, British, Belgian, Serbian, Romanian, Italian, Portuguese and Australian POWs in Cottbus (Chóśebuz). After the war, until 1923, the former POW camp was used as a concentration camp for some 1,200 to 1,500 Polish activists, civilians and insurgents (including women with children) of the Silesian Uprisings of 1919–1921, who were often subjected to harassment, beatings and tortures.

In the interbellum, the German government carried out a massive campaign of changing of place names in Lusatia in order to erase traces of Slavic origin, and while most of the historic names were restored after World War II, some were retained.

This era came to an end during the Nazi regime in Germany, when all Sorbian organizations were abolished and forbidden, newspapers and magazines closed, and any use of the Sorbian languages was prohibited.

=== World War II ===
During World War II, some Sorbian activists were arrested, executed, exiled or sent as political prisoners to concentration camps. From 1942 to 1944 the underground Lusatian National Committee was formed and was active in German-occupied Warsaw.

During the war, the Germans established and operated several prisoner-of-war camps, including Oflag III-C, Oflag IV-D, Oflag 8, Stalag III-B, Stalag IV-A and Stalag VIII-A, with multiple forced labour subcamps in the region. Prisoners included Polish POWs and civilians, and French, Belgian, British, Australian, New Zealander, Canadian, South African, Dutch, Italian, Soviet, Serbian, Slovak and American POWs.

There were several Nazi prisons with multiple forced labour subcamps, including in Görlitz, Luckau, Zittau, and a prison solely for women in Cottbus, and multiple subcamps of the Gross-Rosen concentration camp, the prisoners of which were mostly Jews, Poles and Russians, but also Frenchmen, Italians, Yugoslavs, Czechs, Belgians, etc.

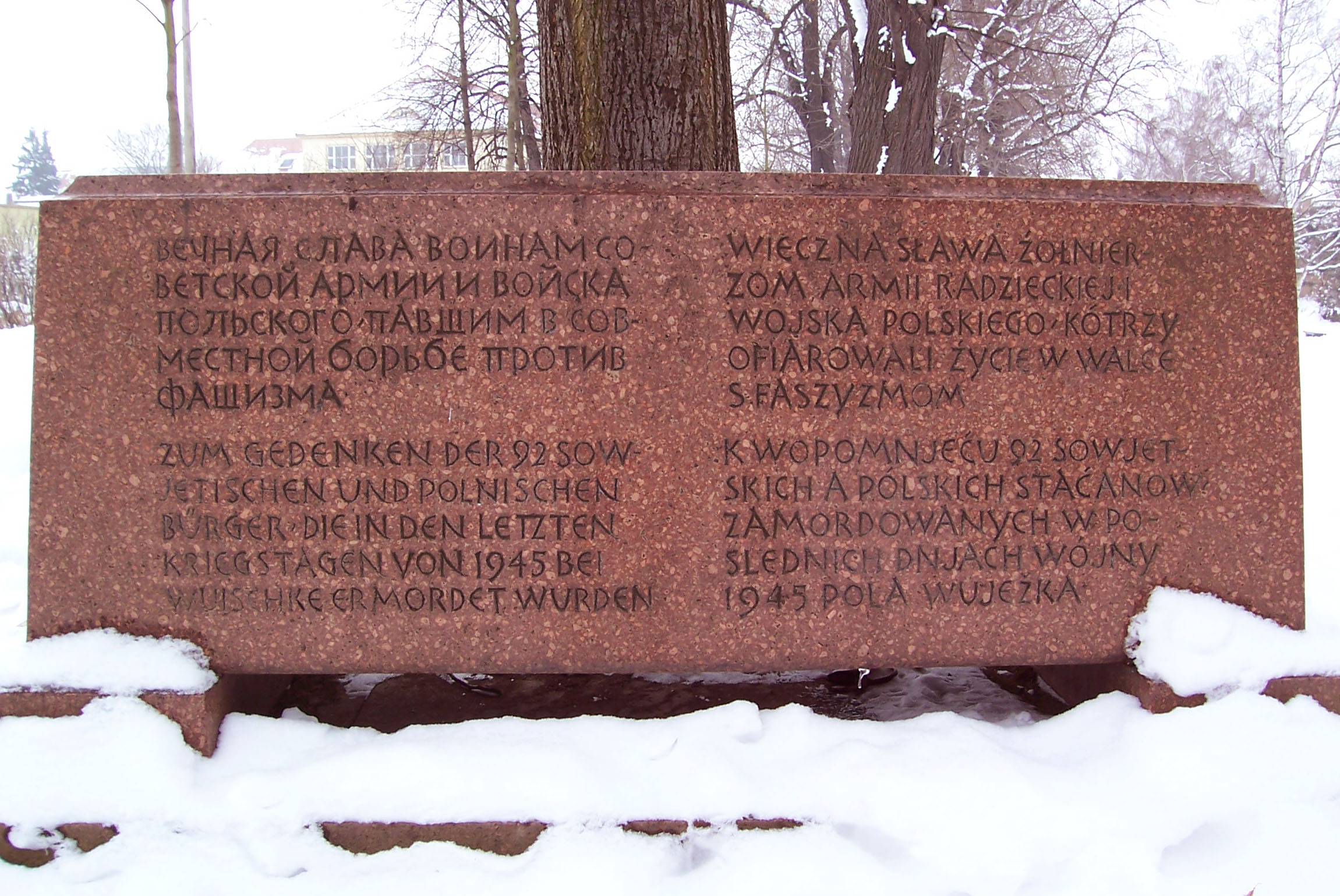
Memorial to Soviet and Polish troops fallen in the Battle of Bautzen (1945)

During the war, the Poles postulated that after the defeat of Germany, the Sorbs should be allowed free national development either within the borders of Poland or Czechoslovakia, or as an independent Sorbian state in alliance with Poland.

The Eastern Front reached Lusatia in early 1945, with Soviet and Polish troops defeating the Germans and capturing the region. In Horka, on April 26, 1945, the Germans carried out a massacre of a field hospital column of the 9th Polish Armored Division, killing some 300 POWs, mostly wounded soldiers and medical personnel (see German atrocities committed against Polish prisoners of war).

=== Since 1945 ===
The flag of the Lusatian National movement

After World War II according to the Potsdam Agreement, Lusatia was divided between Allied-occupied Germany (Soviet occupation zone) and the Republic of Poland along the Oder–Neisse line. Poland's communist government expelled all remaining Germans and Sorbs from the area east of the Neisse river in 1945 and 1946 in accordance with the Potsdam Agreement. The Lusatian National Committee in Prague claimed the right to self-government and separation from Germany and the creation of a Lusatian Free State or attachment to Czechoslovakia.

The majority of the Sorbian intelligentsia was organized in the Domowina, though, and did not wish to split from Germany. Claims asserted by the Lusatian National movement were postulates of joining Lusatia to Poland or Czechoslovakia. Between 1945 and 1947 they produced about ten memorials to the United States, Soviet Union, Great Britain, France, Poland, and Czechoslovakia. This did not bring any results.

In April 1946, the Lusatian National Committee submitted a petition to the Polish Government, signed by Paweł Cyż – the minister and an official Sorbian delegate in Poland. There was also a project to proclaim a Lusatian Free State, whose Prime Minister was intended to be the Polish archaeologist of Lusatian origin, Wojciech Kóčka.

In 1945, the northeastern part of Upper Lusatia west of the Neisse rejoined Saxony and in 1952, when the state was divided into three administrative areas (Bezirke), the Upper Lusatian region became part of the Dresden administrative region. After the East German Revolution of 1989, the state of Saxony was reestablished in 1990. Lower Lusatia remained with Brandenburg, from 1952 until 1990 in the Bezirk of Cottbus.

In 1950, the Sorbs obtained language and cultural autonomy within the then–East German state of Saxony. Lusatian schools and magazines were launched and the Domowina association was revived, although under increasing political control of the ruling Communist Socialist Unity Party of Germany (SED). At the same time, the large German-speaking majority of the Upper Lusatian population kept up a considerable degree of local, 'Upper Lusatian' patriotism of its own. An attempt to establish a Lusatian Land within the Federal Republic of Germany failed after German reunification in 1990. The constitutions of Saxony and Brandenburg guarantee cultural rights, but not autonomy, to the Sorbs.

== Demographics ==
=== Sorbs ===
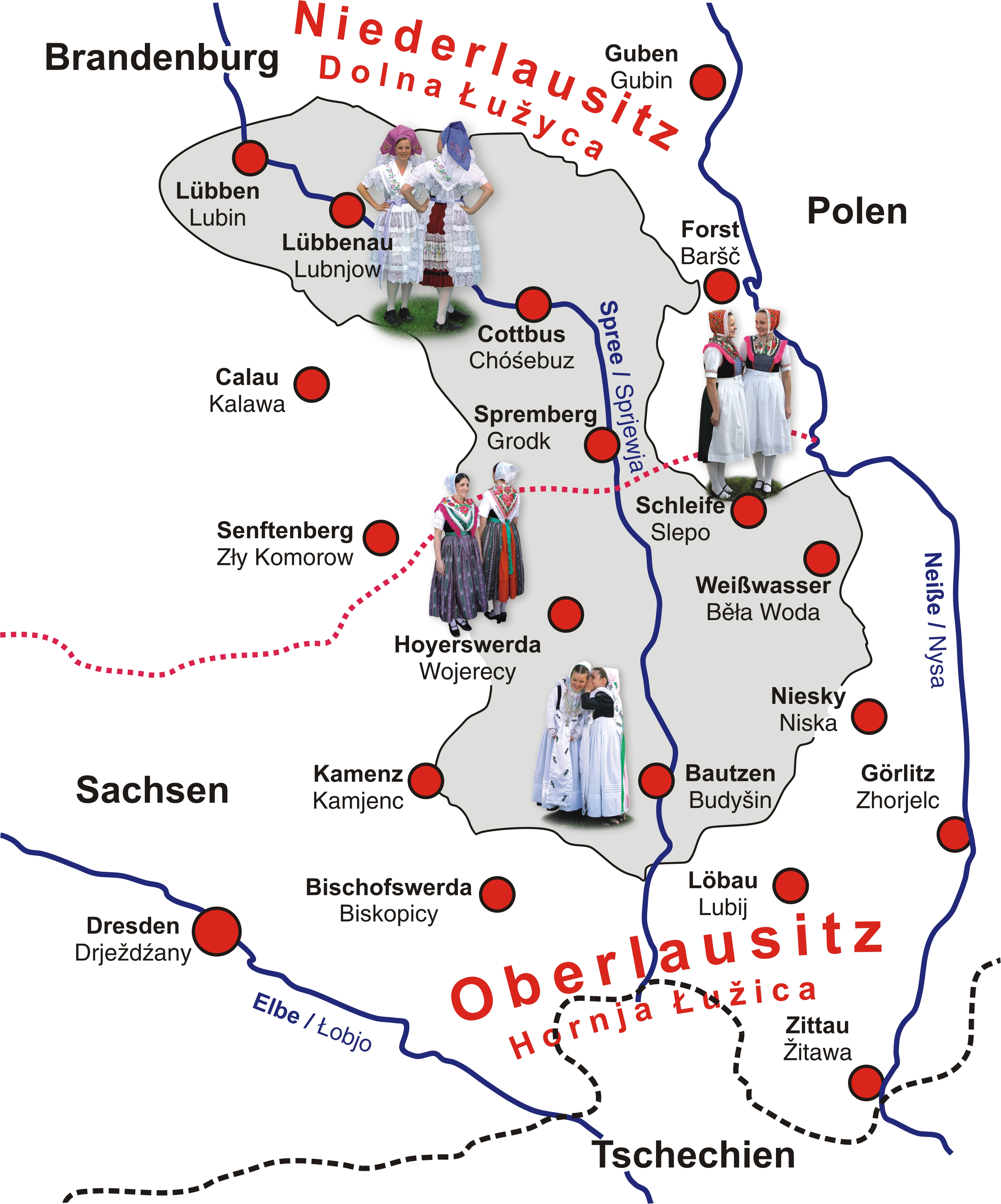
The bilingual part of Lusatia, where the Sorbs make more than 10% of the population

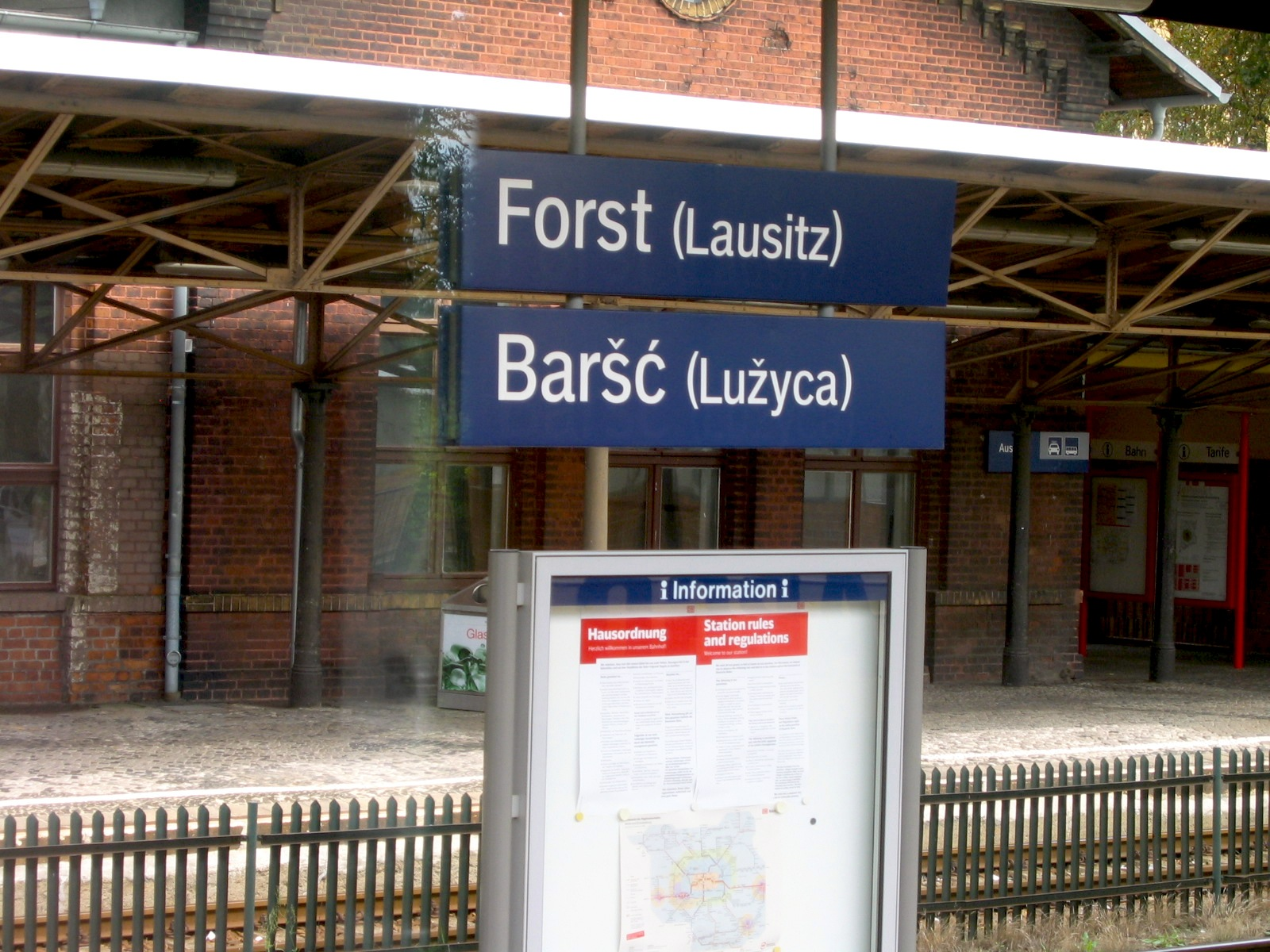
Bilingual station of Forst (Lausitz)

More than 80,000 of the Sorbian Slavic minority continue to live in the region. Historically, their ancestors are West-Slavic-speaking tribes such as the Milceni, who settled in the region between the Elbe and the Saale. Many still speak their language (though numbers are dwindling and especially Lower Sorbian is considered endangered), and road signs are usually bilingual. However, the number of all the inhabitants of this part of eastern Saxony is declining rapidly – by 20% in the last 10 to 15 years. Sorbs make efforts to protect their traditional culture manifested in the traditional folk costumes and the style of village houses.

The coal industry in the region, like the Schwarze Pumpe power station needing vast areas of land, destroyed dozens of Lusatian villages in the past and threatens some of them even now. The Sorbian language is taught at many primary and some secondary schools and at two universities, Leipzig and Prague. Project "Witaj" ("welcome!") is a project of eight preschools where Sorbian is currently the main language for a few hundred Lusatian children.

There is a daily newspaper in the Sorbian language (Serbske Nowiny); a Sorbian radio station (Serbski Rozhłós) uses local frequencies of two otherwise German-speaking radio stations for several hours a day. There are very limited programmes on television (once a month) in Sorbian on two regional television stations (RBB and MDR TV).

In 2020, despite the loss of the Sorbian language in most of Lusatia, there are some Sorbian traditions and habits that still live on to this day. In February, many people (mostly people from villages, regardless of German or Sorbian ancestry) will still engage in the Sorbian tradition of Zampern (a festive procession). Some Sorbian dishes like boiled potatoes with linseed oil and curd (German: Quark mit Leineöl) are still prevalent and, today, are eaten in other parts of Germany (like Berlin or western Saxony) too.

Spreewälder Gurken (pickled cucumbers potted by using a special mixture of herbs and spices) are often associated with the Sorbs even though the cucumbers themselves were introduced by Dutch migrants, who started to pickle them for higher durability. Soon Sorbs adopted the pickling and might have changed the recipes slightly over time.

The traditional Sorbian costumes are still to be worn in the Spreewald region even though mainly in the tourism industry. Recently, some women started to revive traditional clothes by using them as wedding dresses, even though this practise differs from original traditions.

=== Demographics in 1900 ===
Percentage of Sorbs:

- Cottbus (Chóśebuz) (Province of Brandenburg) 55.8%
- Hoyerswerda (Wojerecy) (Province of Silesia) 37.8%
- Bautzen (Budyšin) (Kingdom of Saxony) 17.7%
- Rothenburg, Oberlausitz (Rózbork) (Province of Silesia) 17.2%
- Kamenz (Kamjenc) (Kingdom of Saxony) 7.1%

Total number: 93,032

The percentage of Sorbs in Lusatia has decreased since the 1900 census due to intermarriage, Germanization, cultural assimilation related to industrialization and urbanization, Nazi suppression and discrimination, ethnocide and the settlement of expelled Germans after World War II, mainly from Lower Silesia and northern Bohemia.

=== Largest cities ===
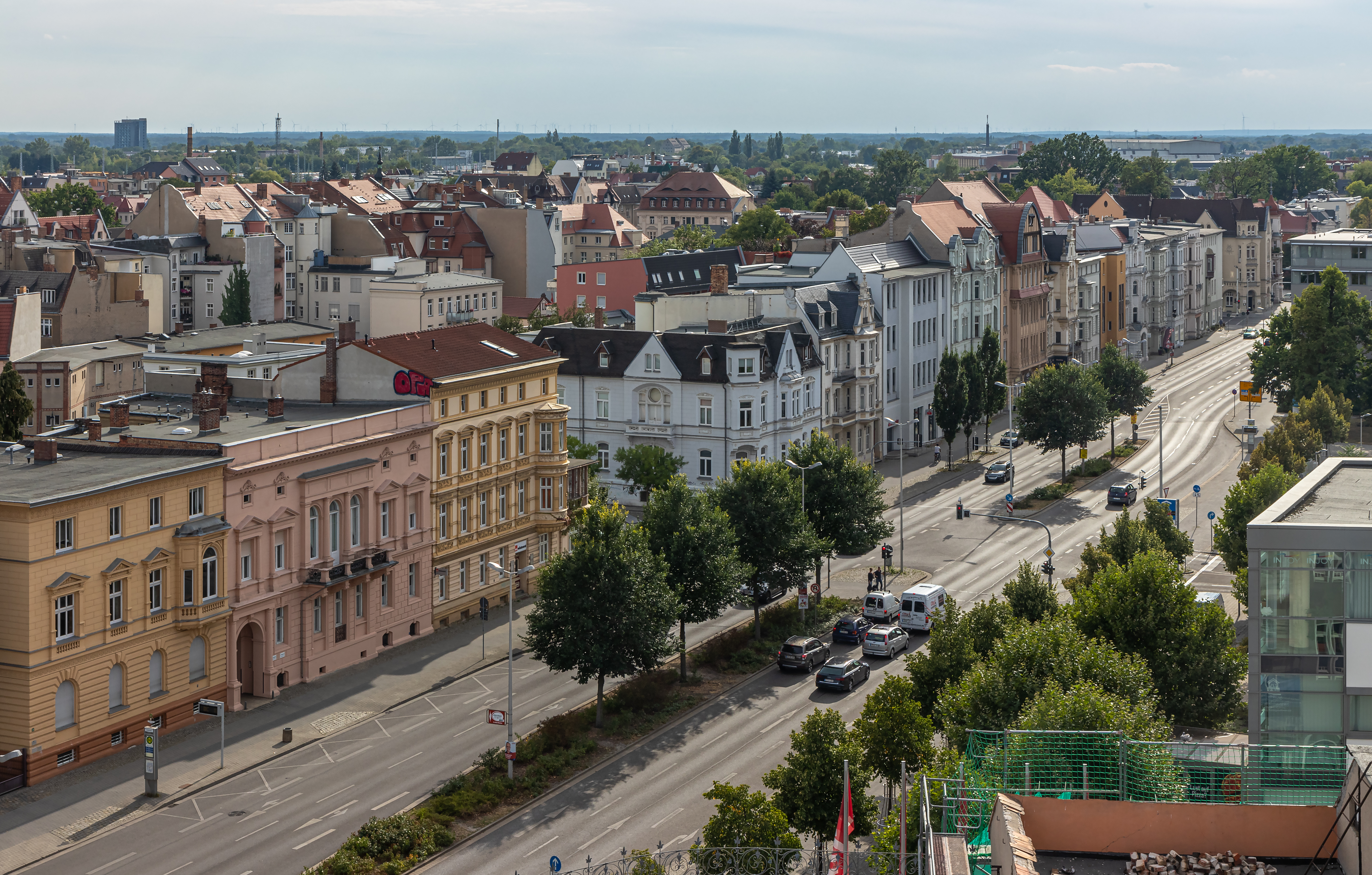
Cottbus (Chóśebuz)

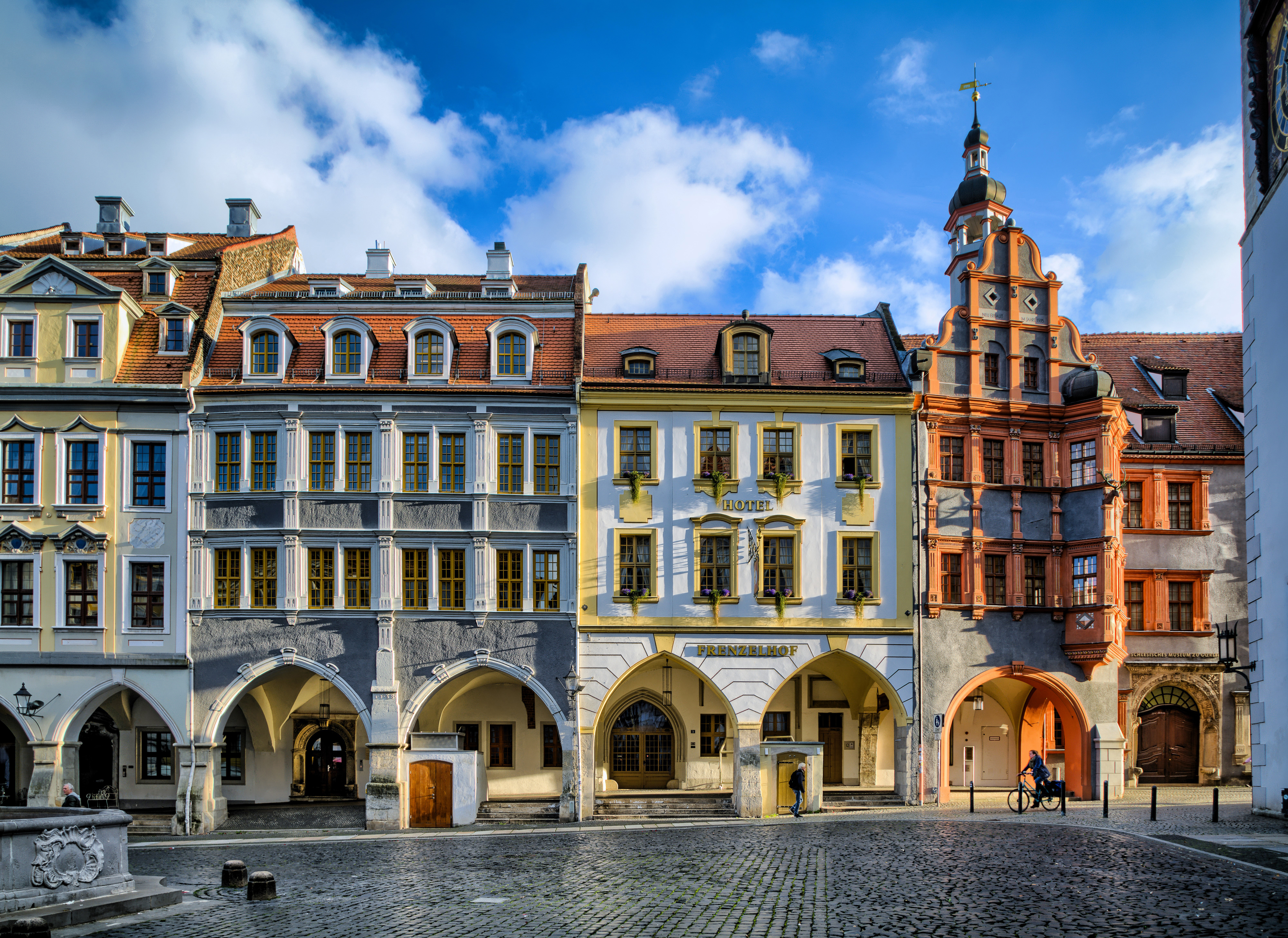
Görlitz (Zhorjelc)

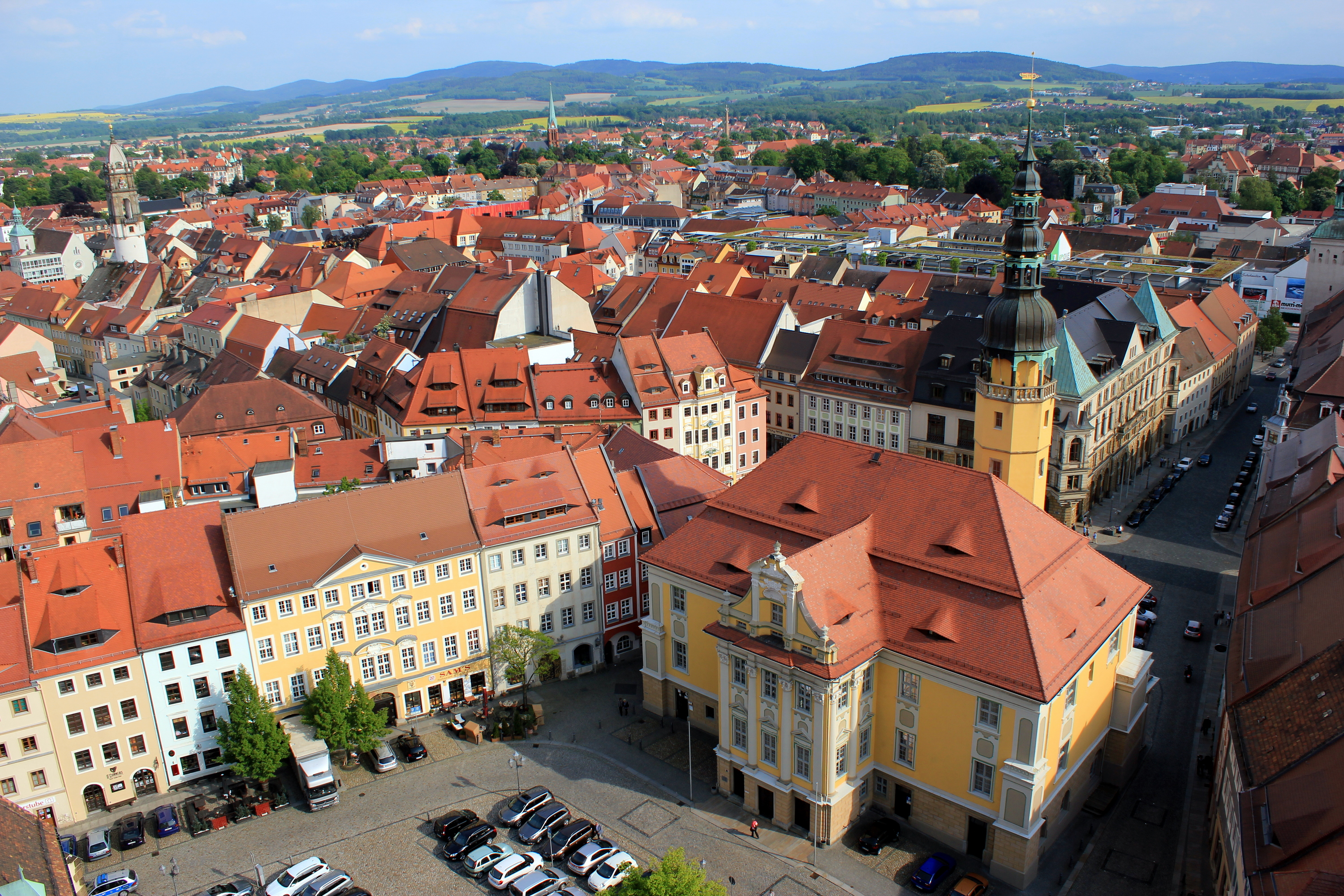
Bautzen (Budyšin)

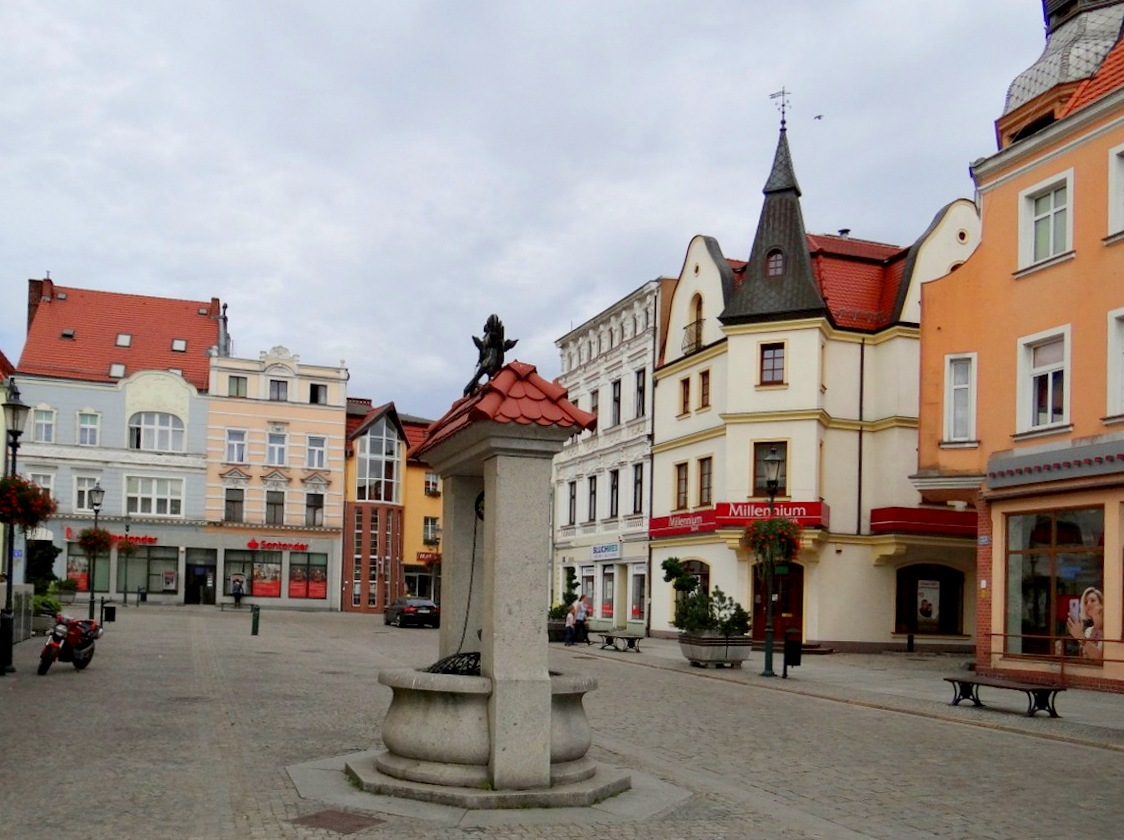
Żary

	City (German or Polish)	Sorbian	Population (2023)	Country	Subregion
1.	Cottbus	Chóśebuz	100.010	(Germany)	Lower Lusatia
2.	Görlitz	Zhorjelc	56.694	(Germany)	Upper Lusatia
3.	Bautzen	Budyšin	38.039	(Germany)	Upper Lusatia
4.	Żary	Žarow	35.198	(Poland)	Lower Lusatia
5.	Hoyerswerda	Wojerecy	31.404	(Germany)	Upper Lusatia
6.	Zgorzelec	Zhorjelc	29.313	(Poland)	Upper Lusatia
7.	Zittau	Žitawa	24.710	(Germany)	Upper Lusatia
8.	Eisenhüttenstadt	Pśibrjog	24.447	(Germany)	Lower Lusatia
9.	Senftenberg	Zły Komorow	23.282	(Germany)	Lower Lusatia
10.	Spremberg	Grodk	21.497	(Germany)	Lower Lusatia
11.	Lubań	Lubań Šlešćina	19.756	(Poland)	Upper Lusatia
12.	Forst	Baršć (Łužyca)	17.721	(Germany)	Lower Lusatia
13.	Kamenz	Kamjenc	16.861	(Germany)	Upper Lusatia
14.	Bogatynia	Bogatynja	16.245	(Poland)	Upper Lusatia
15.	Guben	Gubin	16.210	(Germany)	Lower Lusatia
16.	Gubin	Gubin	15.798	(Poland)	Lower Lusatia
17.	Finsterwalde	Grabin	15.864	(Germany)	Lower Lusatia
18.	Lübbenau/Spreewald	Lubnjow/Błota	15.774	(Germany)	Lower Lusatia
19.	Weißwasser/O.L.	Běła Woda	14.992	(Germany)	Upper Lusatia
20.	Löbau	Lubij	14.389	(Germany)	Upper Lusatia

== Culture ==
=== Sights ===
The region is rich in architecture from various reigns, including Czech, Polish, German and Hungarian, whose styles range from Romanesque and Gothic through Renaissance and Baroque to modern architecture.

There are two major Sorbian museums in Cottbus (Serbski muzej Chóśebuz) and Bautzen (Serbski muzej Budyšin).

In Poland, notable museums include the Muzeum Łużyckie ("Lusatian Museum") in Zgorzelec and the Muzeum Pogranicza Śląsko-Łużyckiego ("Museum of Silesian-Lusatian Borderland") in Żary.

Zgorzelec is home to one of Poland's largest war cemeteries.

The CargoLifter airship hangar that now houses the Tropical Islands Resort is the largest freebearing hall in the world.

The Saurierpark Kleinwelka is Germany's largest dinosaur park.

==== UNESCO world heritage sites ====
The Muskau Park in Bad Muskau (Mužakow) and Łęknica is a World Heritage Site and Historic Monument of Poland.

Herrnhut is also a UNESCO world heritage site since 2024.

The Spree Forest as well as the Upper Lusatian Heath and Pond Landscape are UNESCO biosphere reserves.

== Gallery ==
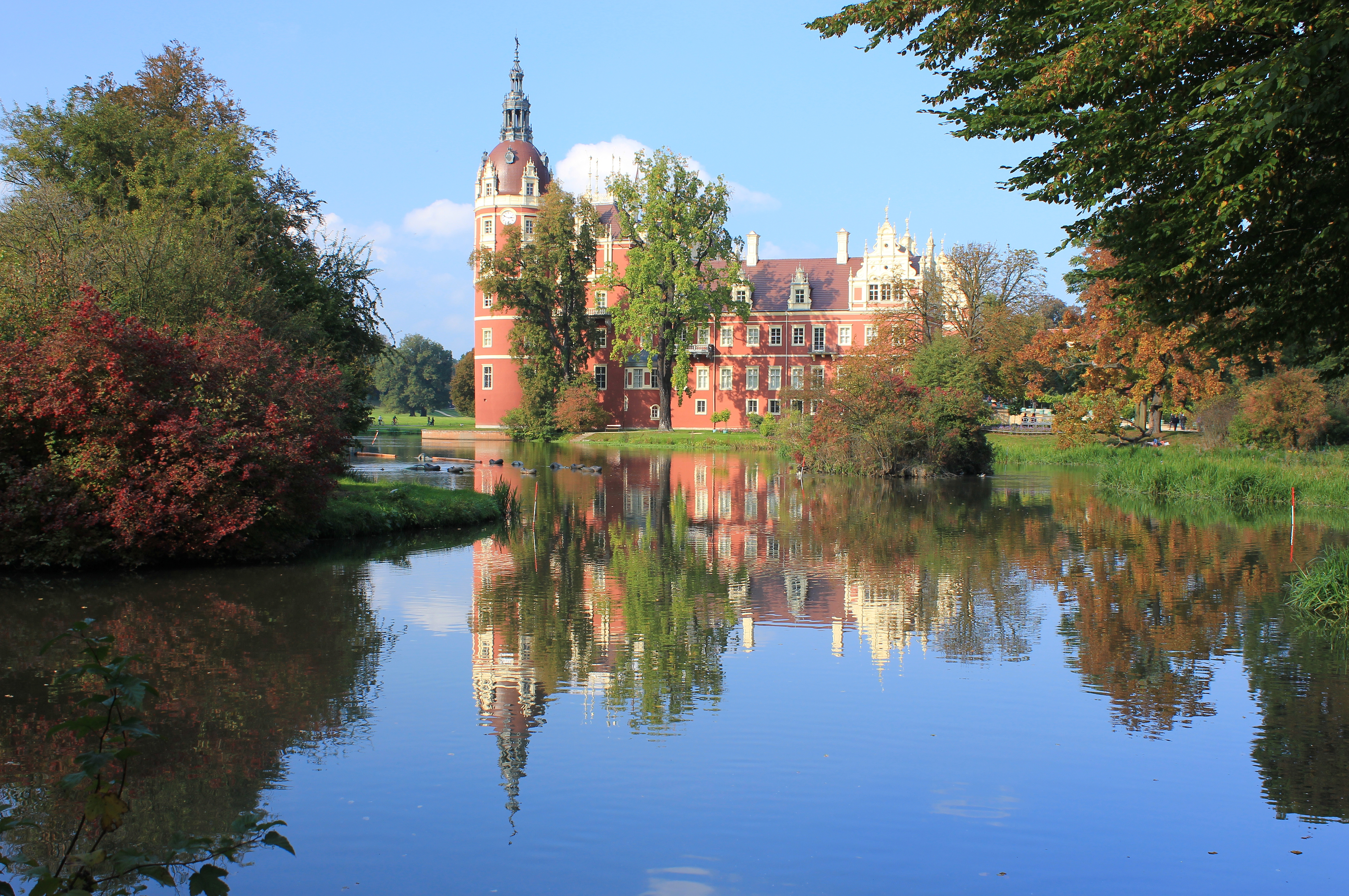
Schloss Muskau

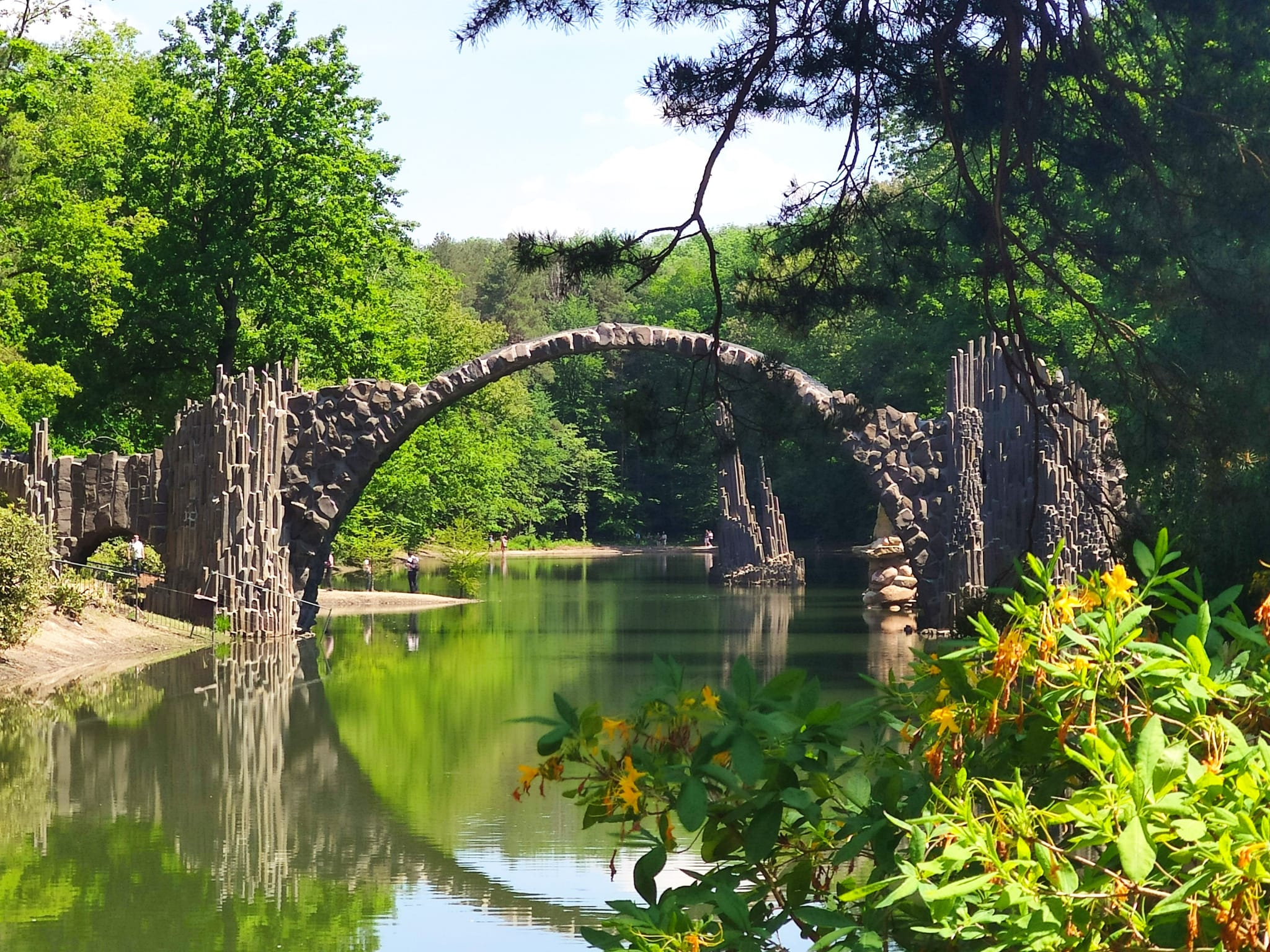
Rakotz Bridge

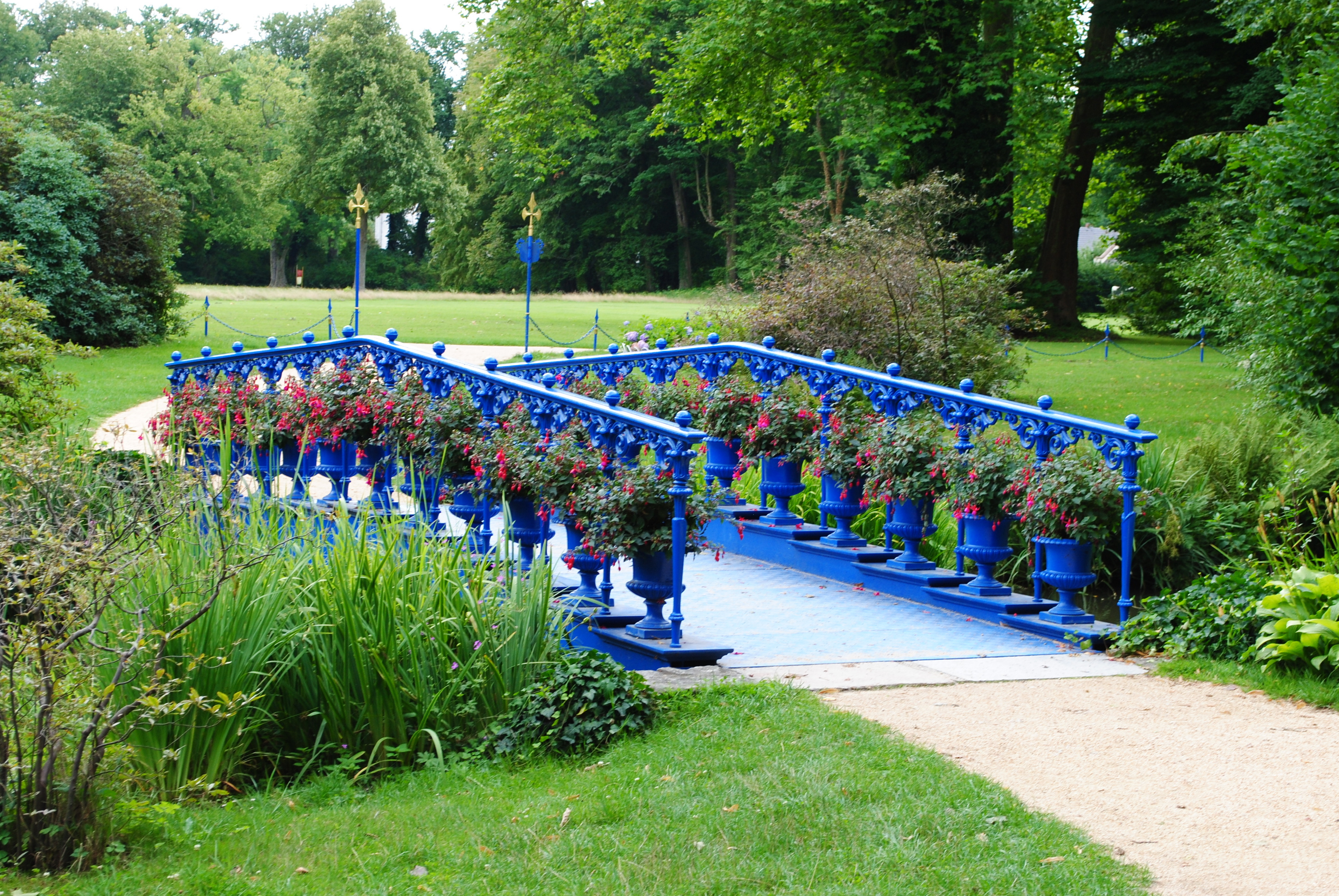
Muskau Park

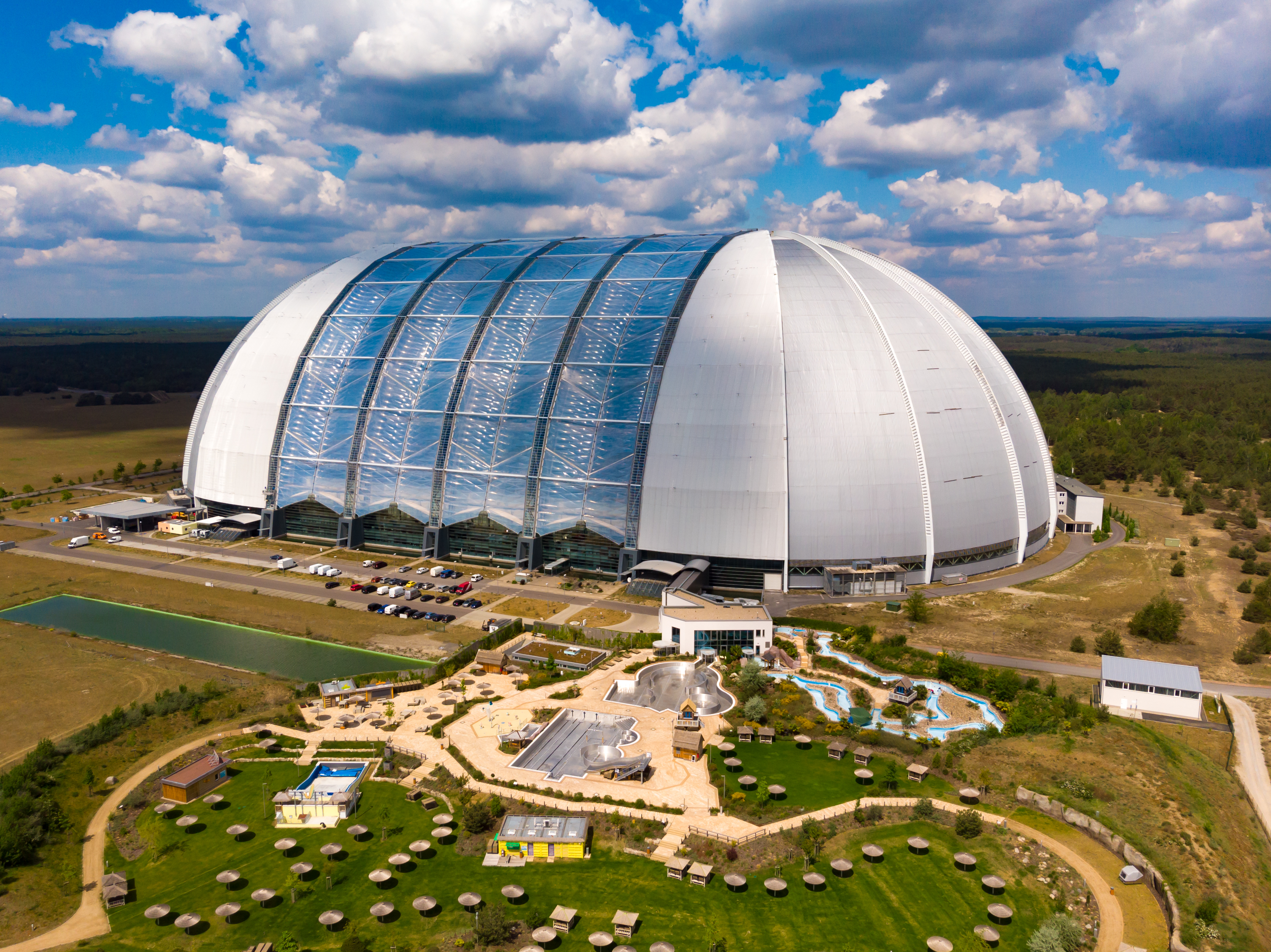
CargoLifter airship hangar

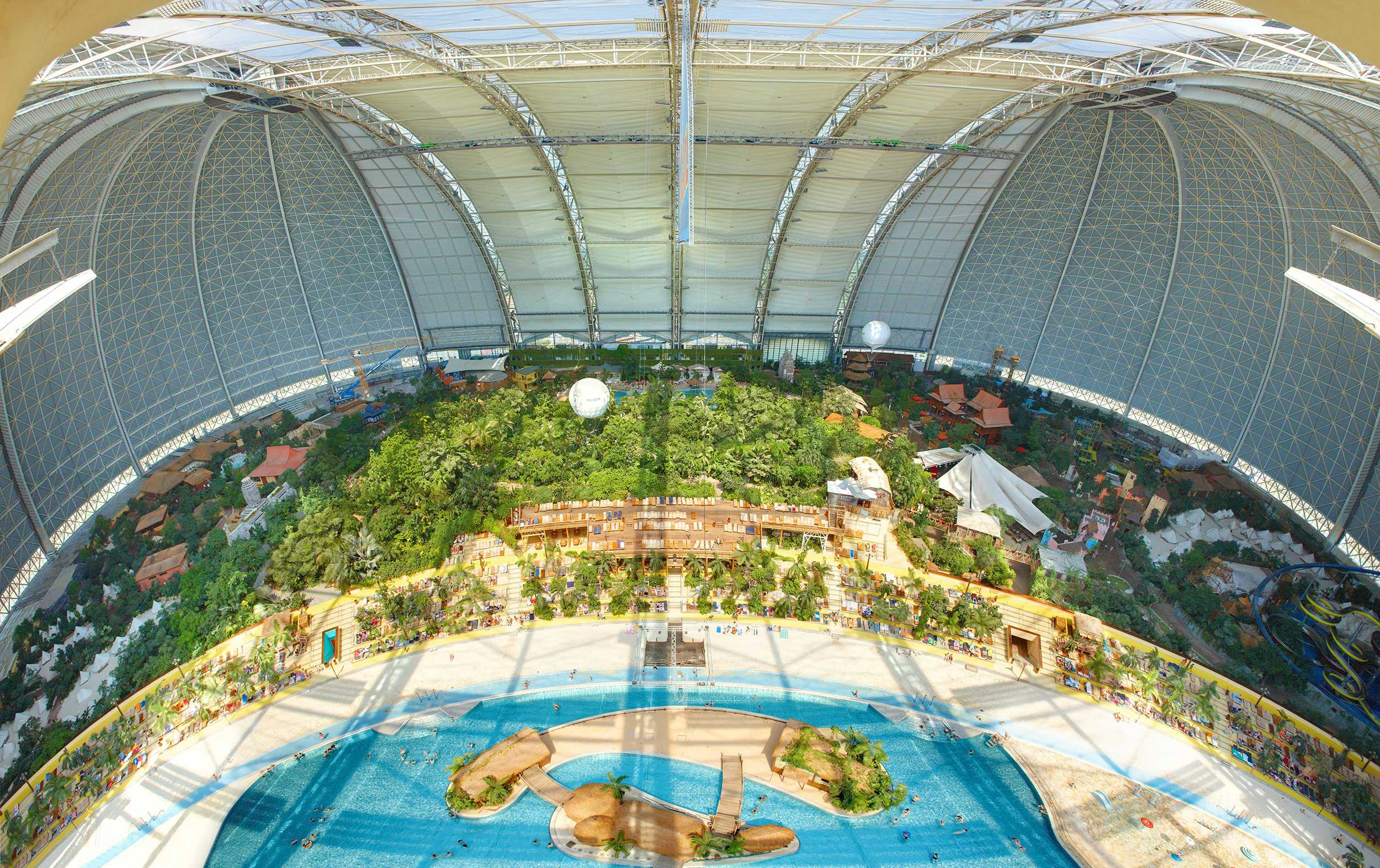
Tropical Islands Resort

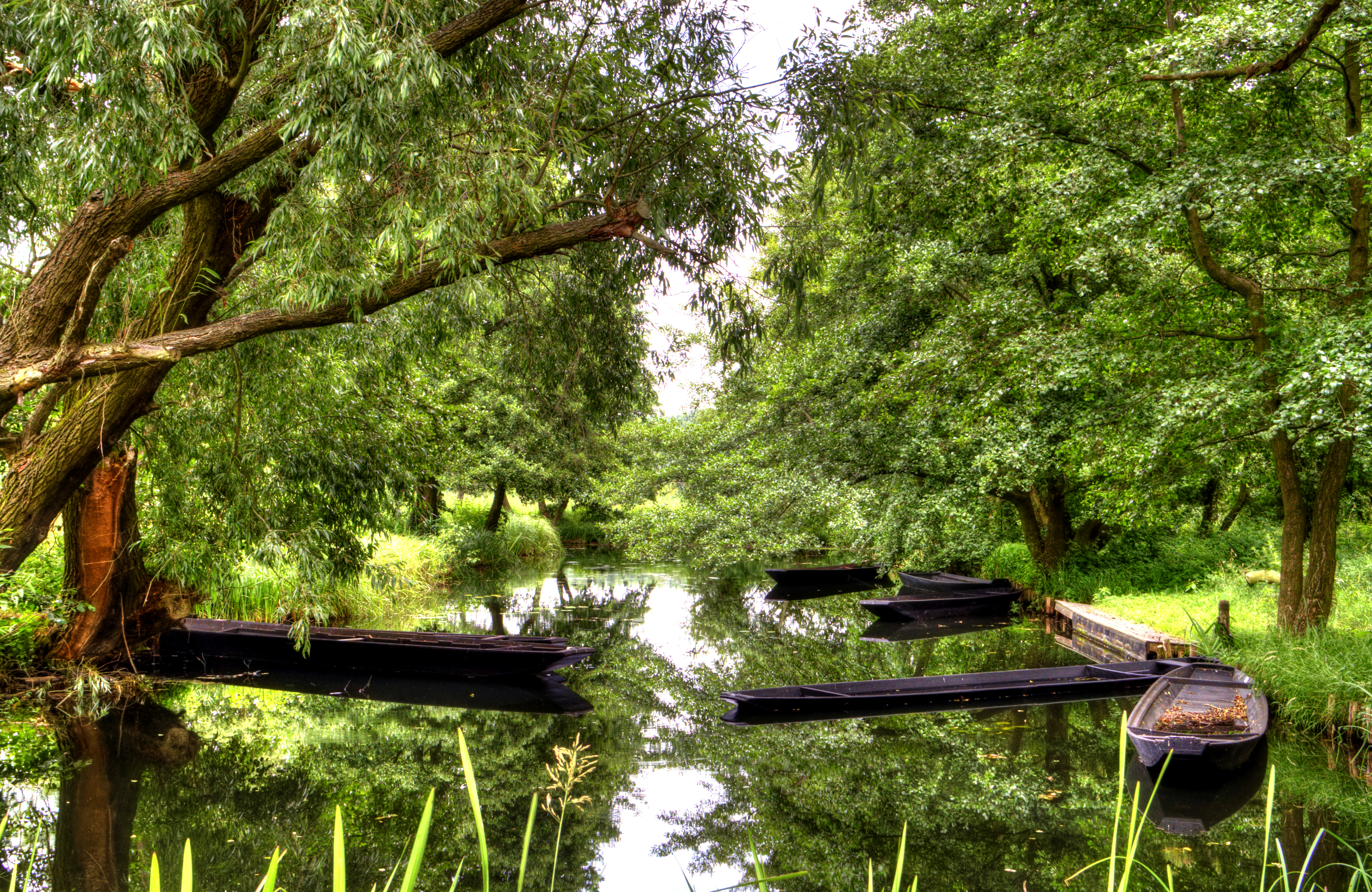
Spree Forest

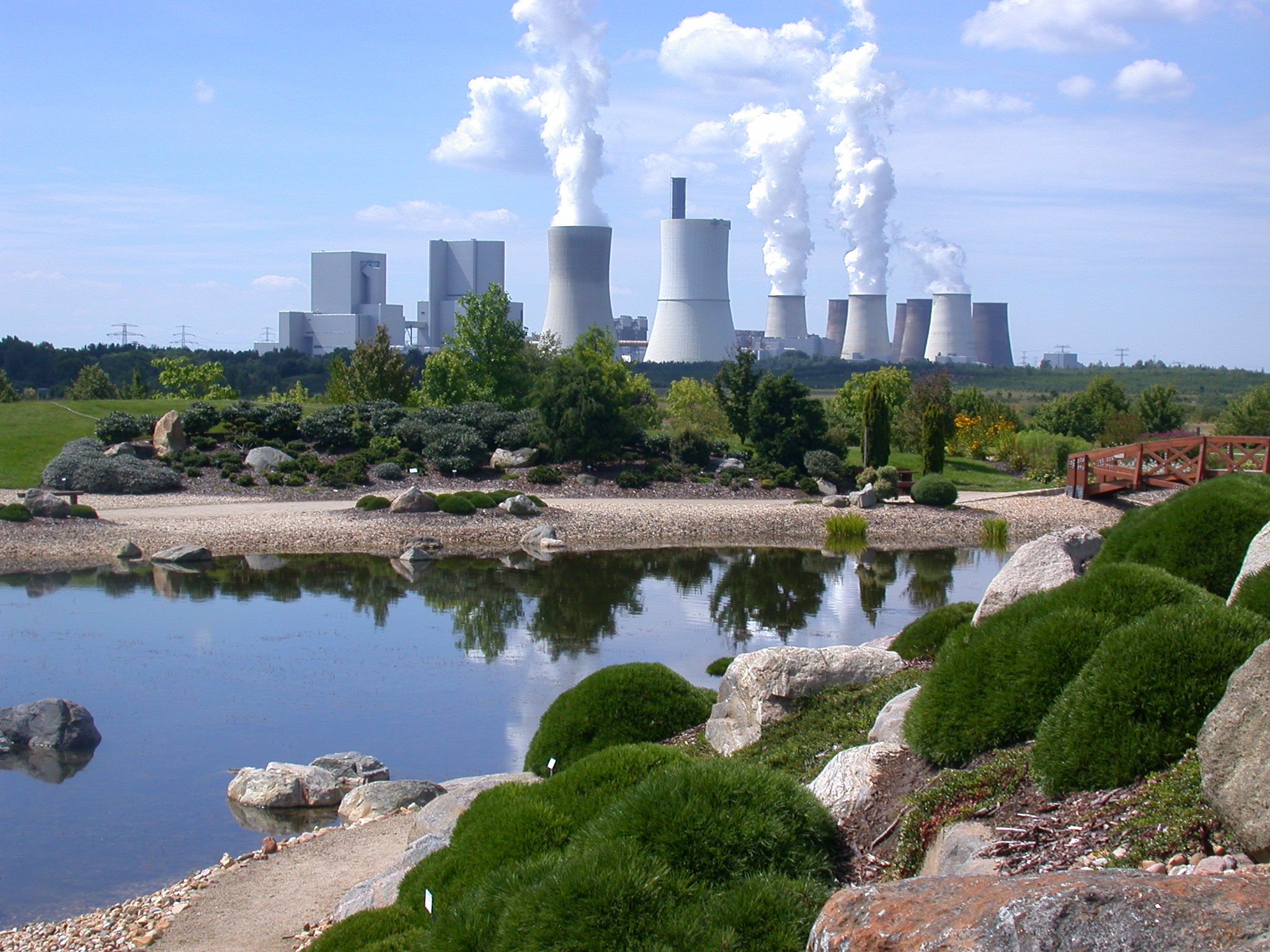
Findlingspark Nochten (Nochten Glacial Erratic Park)

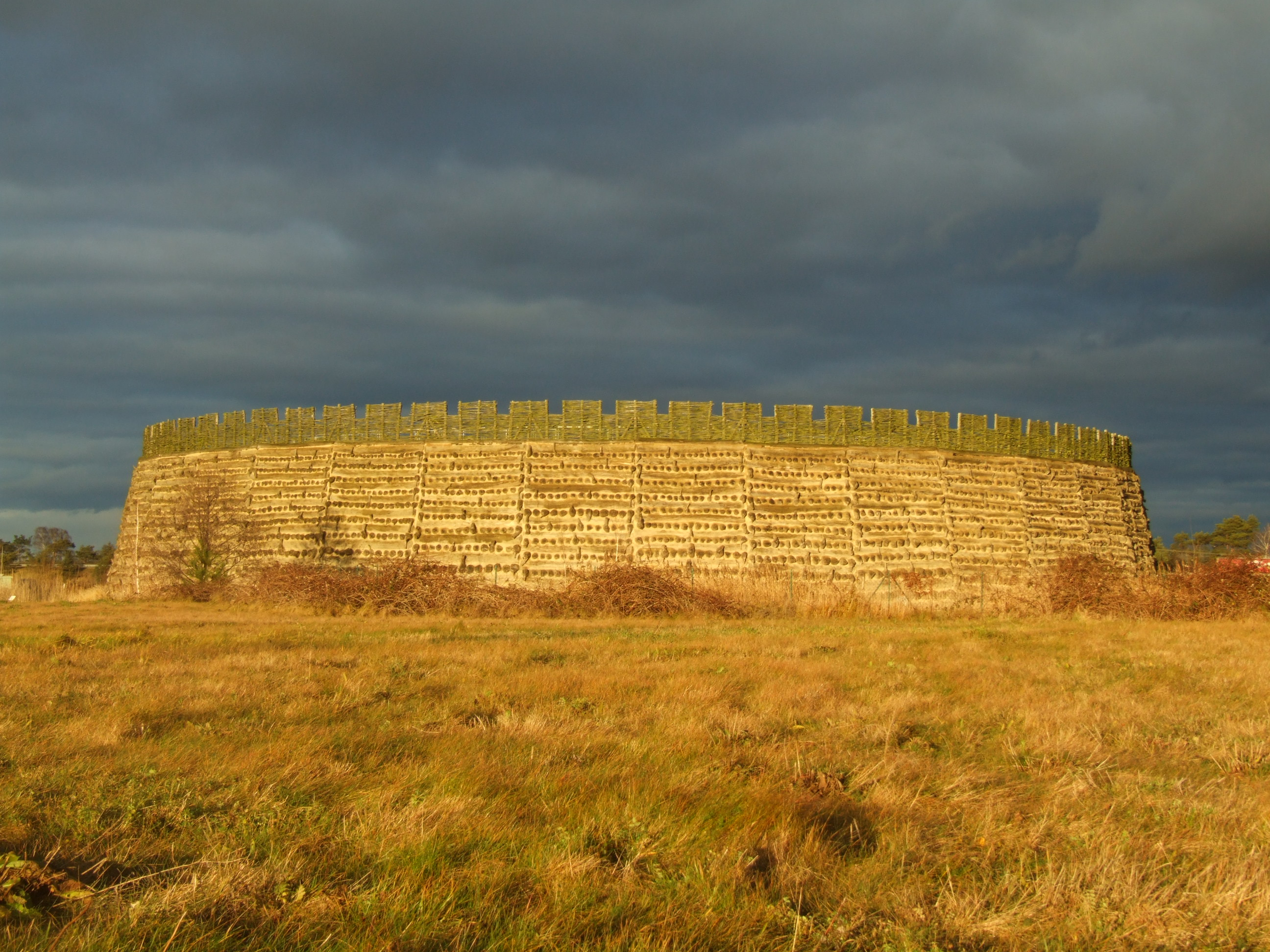
Raddusch Slavic Castle

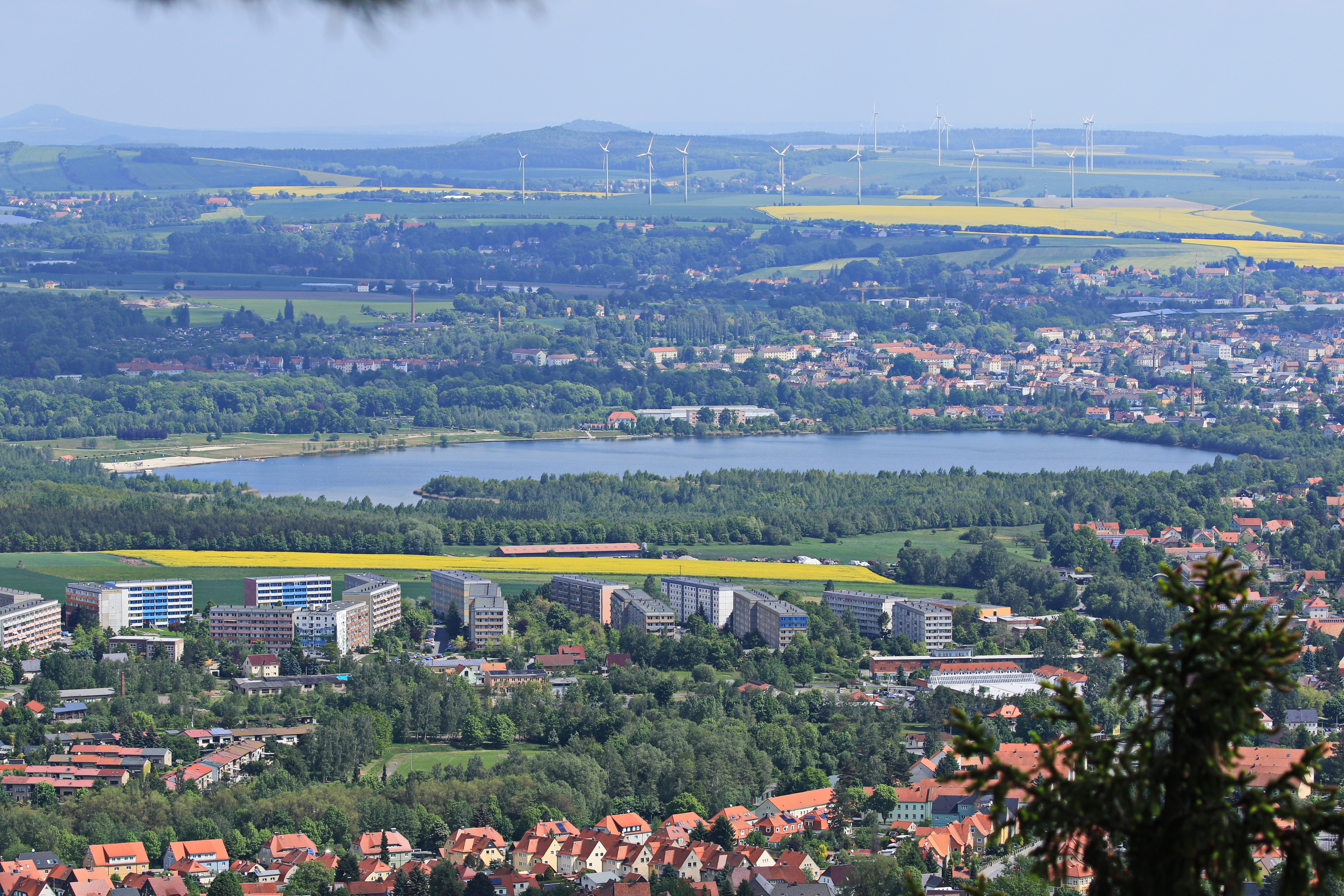
Olbersdorfer See

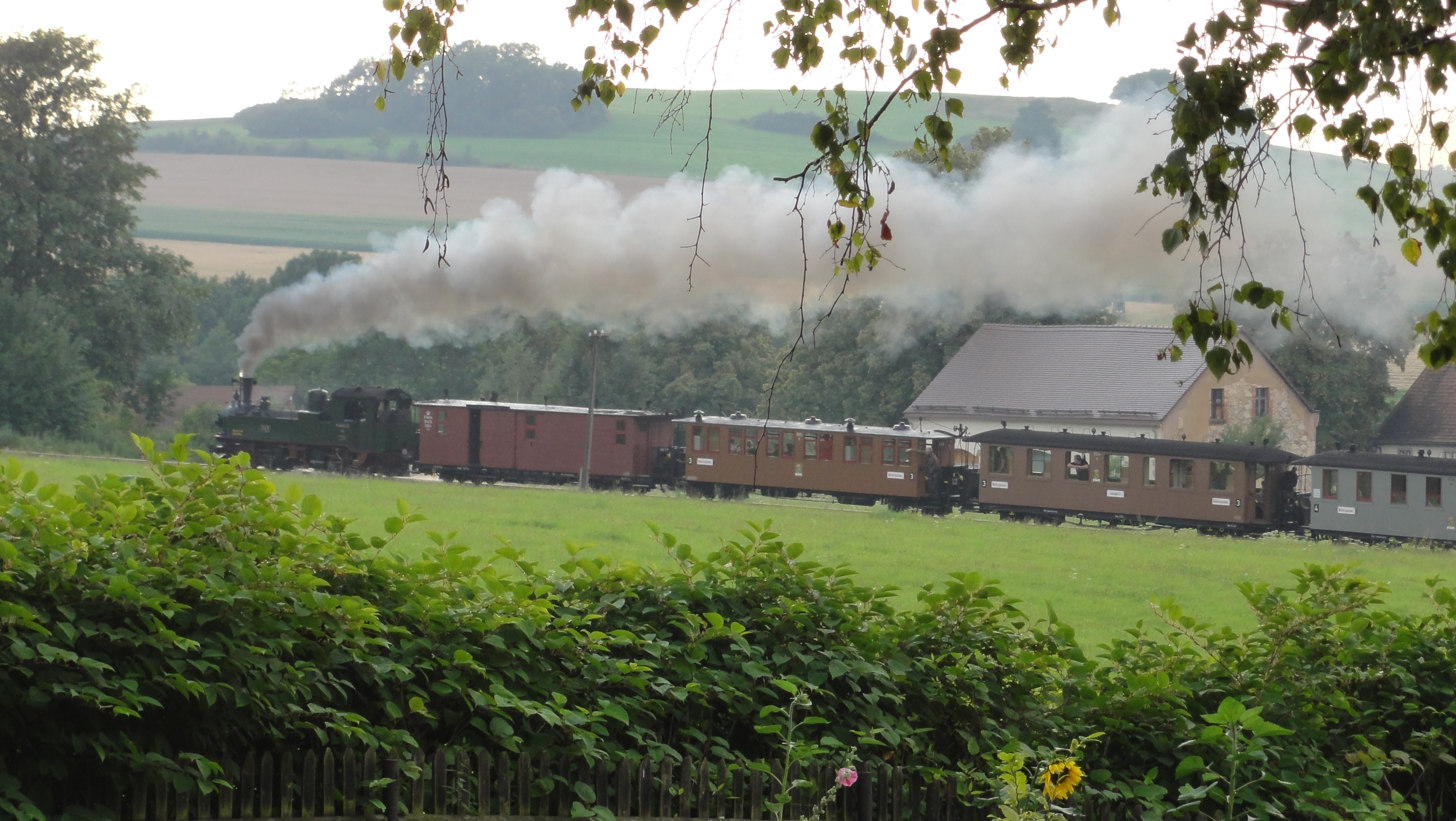
Zittau–Oybin/Jonsdorf railway

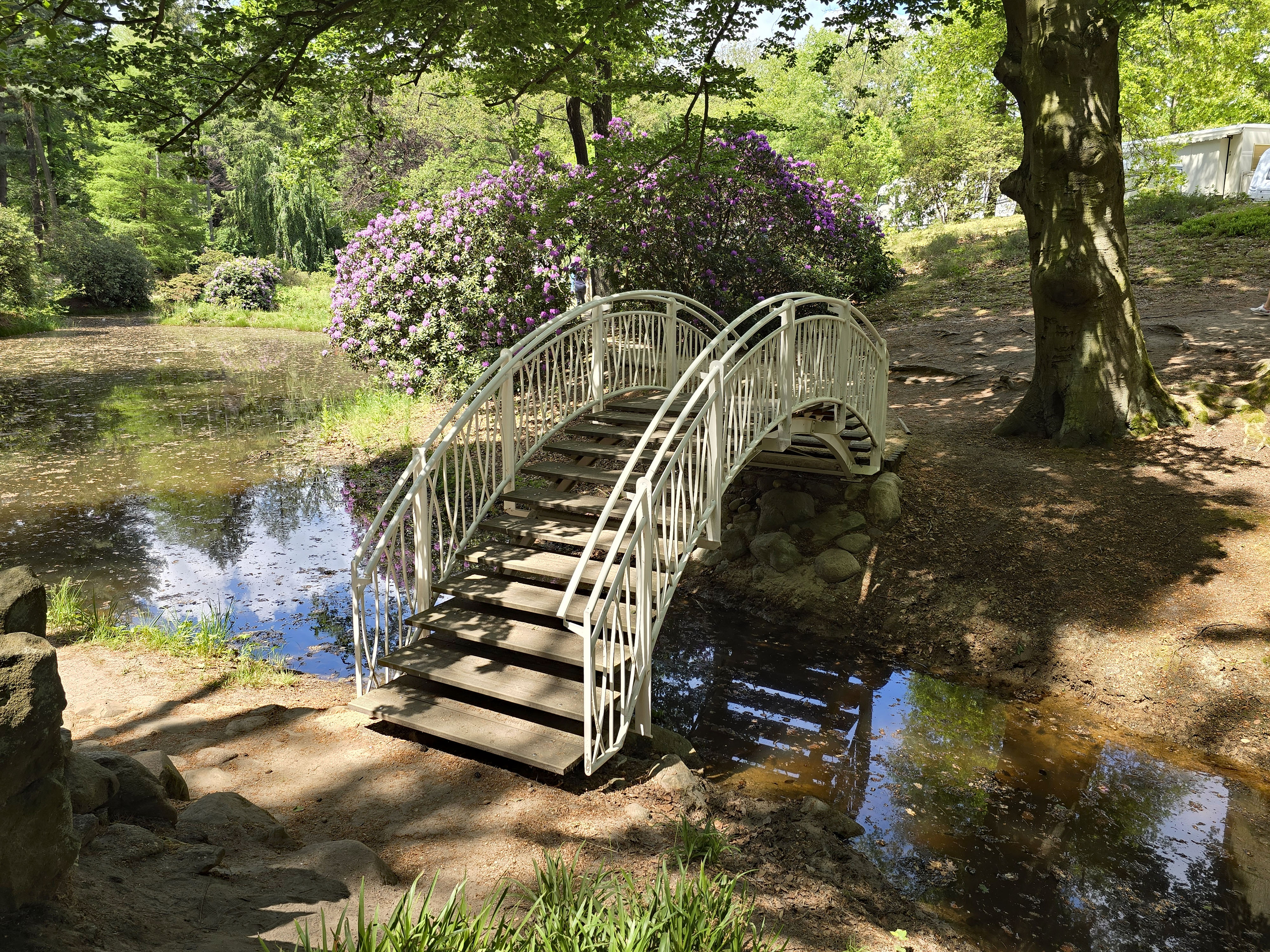
Kromlau Azalea and Rhododendron Park

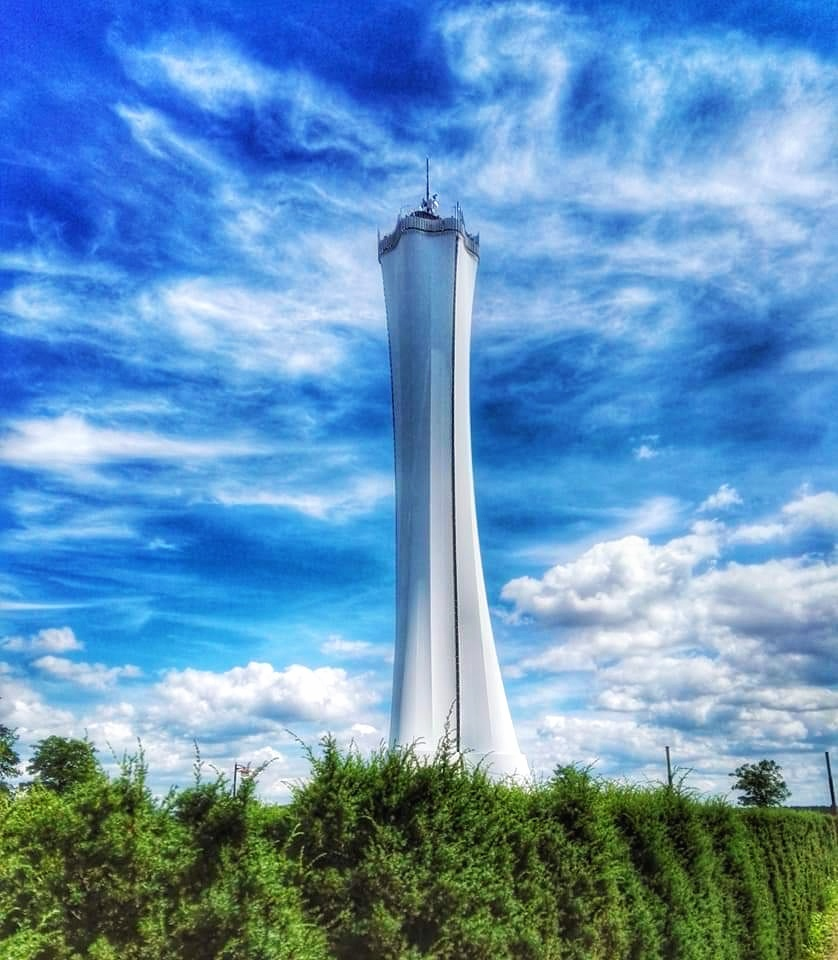
Teichland tower

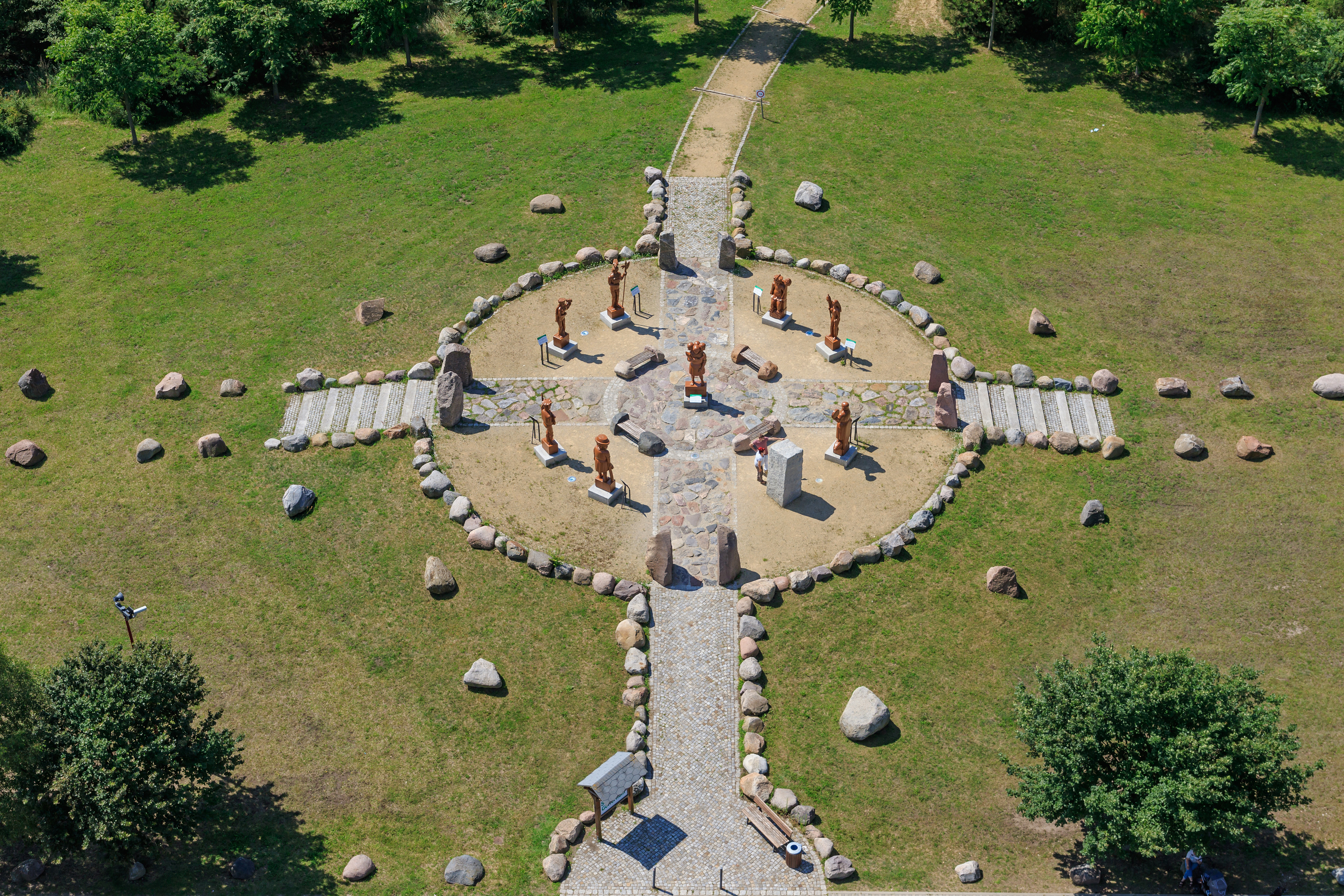
Grove of Slavic Gods

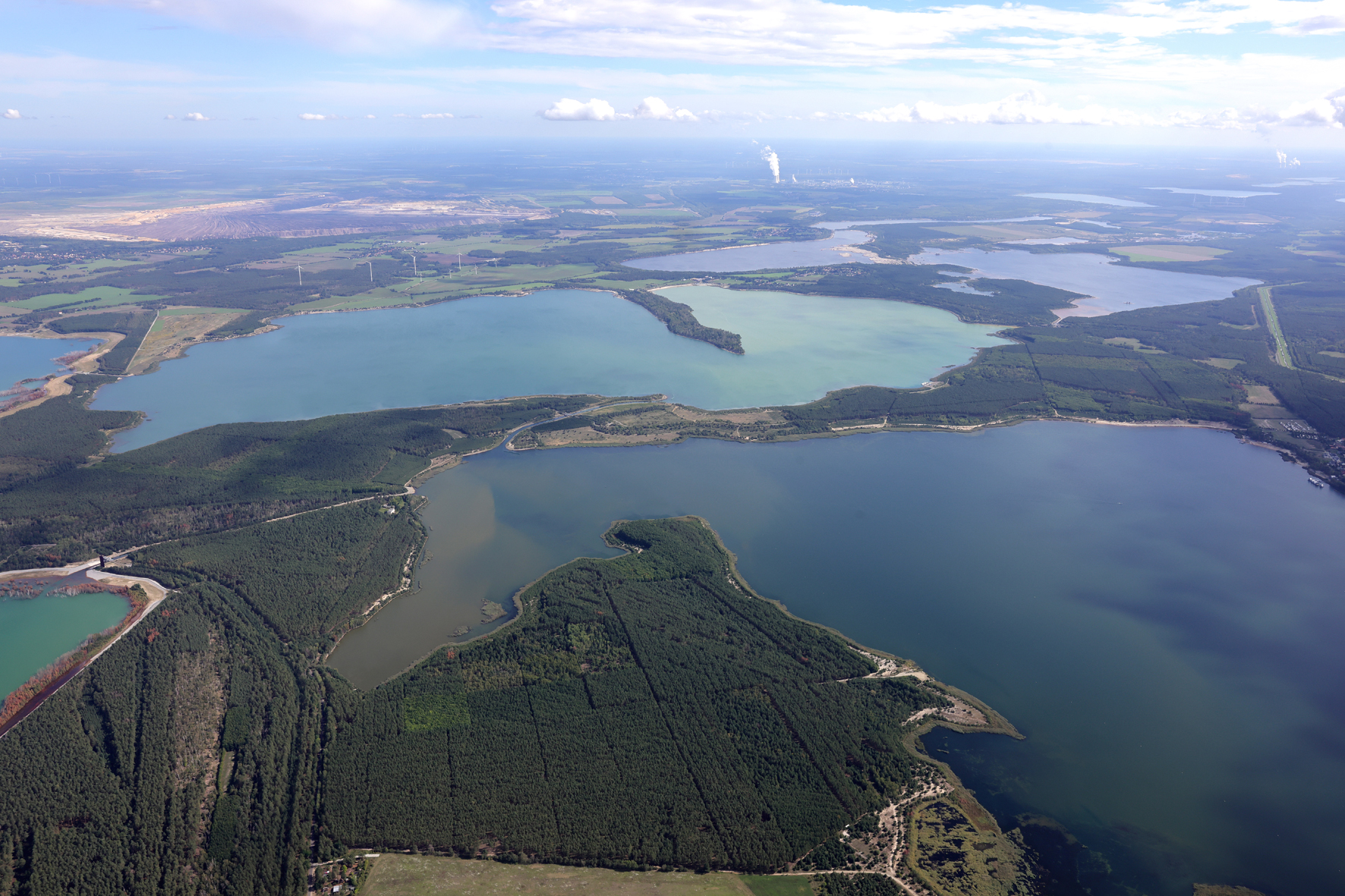
Lusatian Lake District

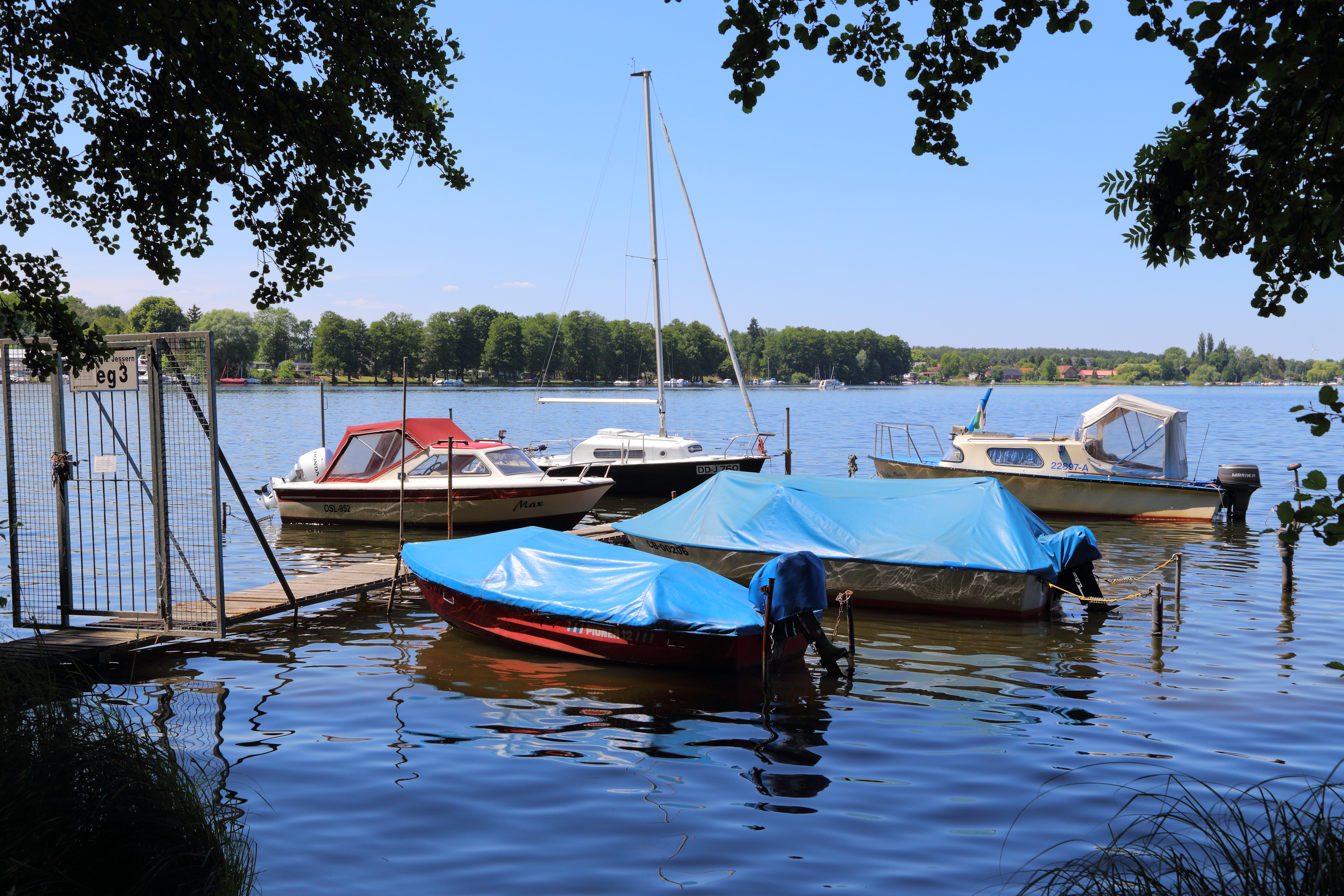
Schwielochsee

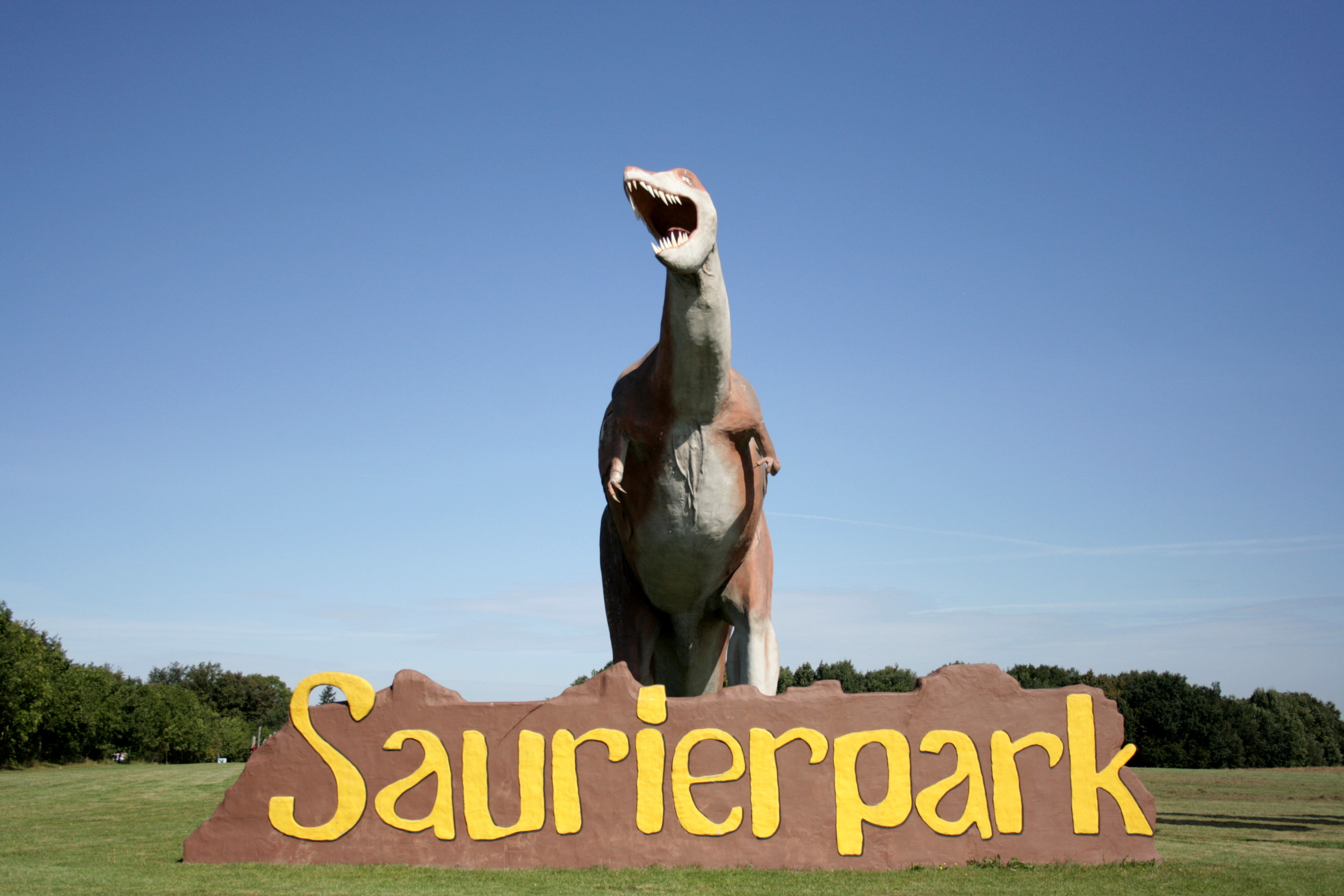
Saurierpark Kleinwelka

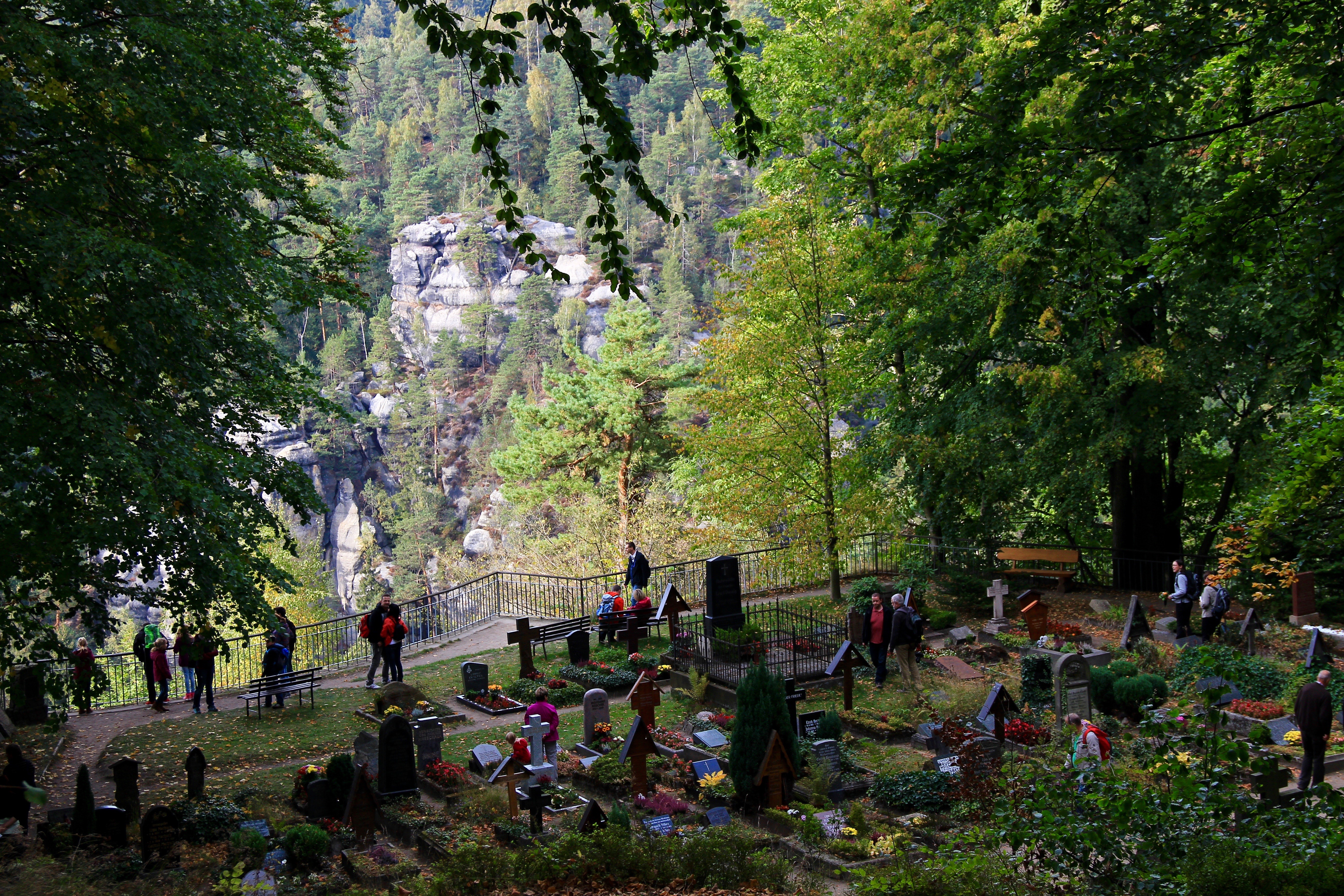
Oybin mountain cemetery

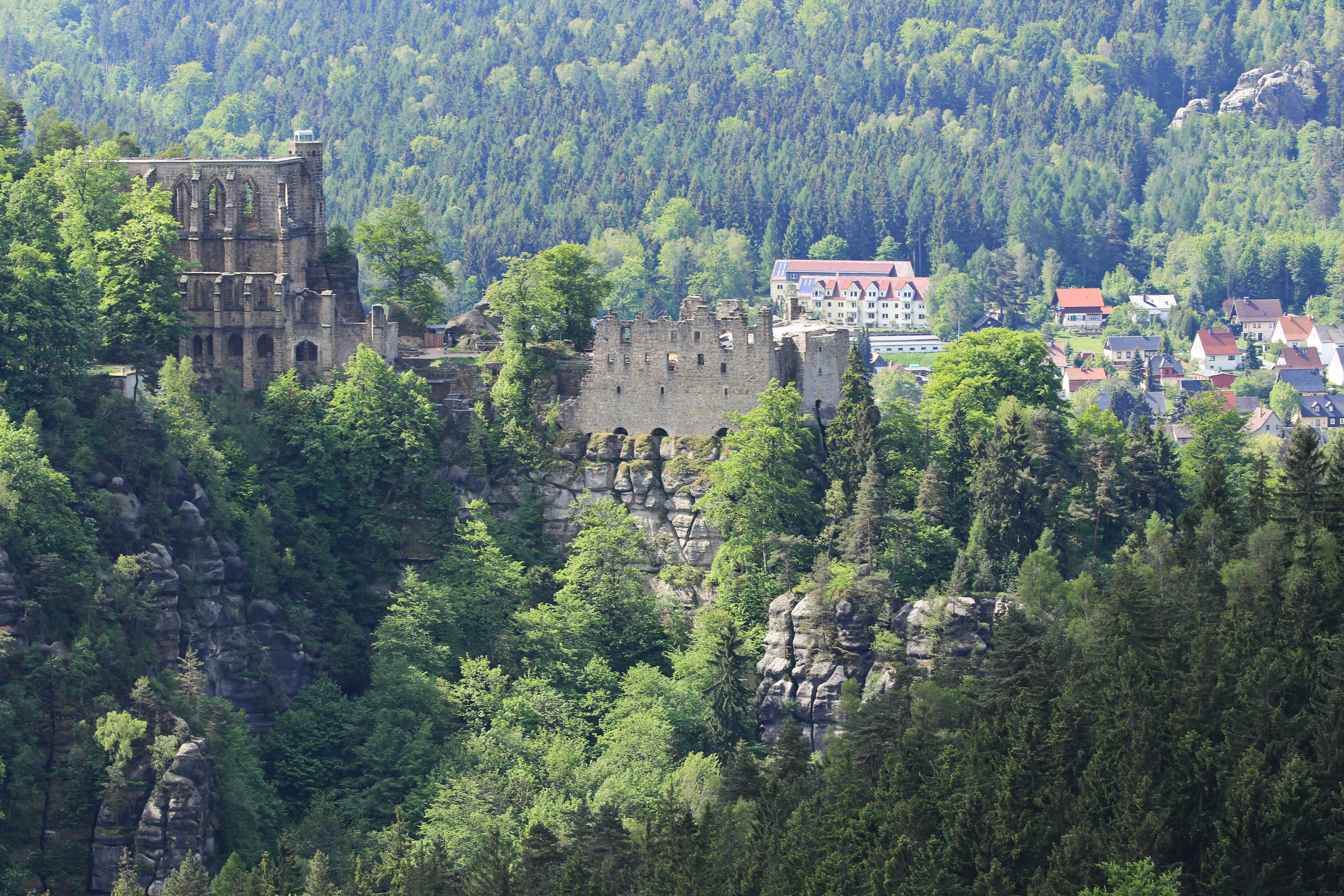
Oybin castle ruin

== See also ==
- Herrnhut Moravian Church and Nicolaus Zinzendorf
- Lusatian League
- Milceni
- Wends
- Obotrites

== Sources ==
- Bachrach, David S. (2020). "The Eastern Campaigns of King Henry II of Germany, 1003–17". Journal of Medieval Military History. 18: 1–36.
- Brie, André: Lausitz – Landschaft mit neuem Gesicht. Michael Imhof Verlag, Petersberg 2011. ISBN 3-865-68538-2.
- Micklitza, Kerstin and André: HB-Bildatlas Spreewald-Lausitz. 4. aktualisierte Aufl. HB Verlag, Ostfildern 2008. ISBN 978-3-616-06115-3.
- Micklitza, Kerstin and André: Lausitz – Unterwegs zwischen Spreewald und Zittauer Gebirge. 5. aktualisierte und erweiterte Aufl. Trescher Verlag, Berlin 2016. ISBN 978-3-89794-330-8.
- Jacob, Ulf: Zwischen Autobahn und Heide. Das Lausitzbild im Dritten Reich. Eine Studie zur Entstehung, Ideologie und Funktion symbolischer Sinnwelten. Hrsg. von der Internationalen Bauausstellung Fürst-Pückler-Land, Großräschen (Zeitmaschine Lausitz), Verlag der Kunst, Dresden in der Verlagsgruppe Husum, Husum 2004. ISBN 3-86530-002-2.
- Lehmann, Rudolf, ed. (1968). Urkundeninventar zur Geschichte der Niederlausitz bis 1400. Köln: Böhlau Verlag.
- Rotter, Ekkehart; Schneidmüller, Bernd, eds. (1981). Widukind von Corvey: Res gestae Saxonicae: Die Sachsengeschichte. Stuttgart: Reclam.
- Stieldorf, Andrea (2026) [2012]. Marken und Markgrafen: Studien zur Grenzsicherung durch die fränkisch-deutschen Herrscher (2nd ed.). Wiesbaden: Harrassowitz Verlag.
- Trillmich, Werner, ed. (1957). Thietmar von Merseburg: Chronik. Darmstadt: Wissenschaftliche Buchgesellschaf.
- Vietinghoff-Riesch, Arnold: Der Oberlausitzer Wald – seine Geschichte und seine Struktur bis 1945 [reprint]. Oberlausitzer Verlag, Spitzkunnersdorf 2004. ISBN 3-933827-46-9.
- Warner, David A., ed. (2001). Ottonian Germany: The Chronicon of Thietmar of Merseburg. Manchester and New York: Manchester University Press.
- Wolfram, Herwig (2010). Conrad II 990-1039: Emperor of Three Kingdoms. University Park: Pennsylvania State University Press.
