= Unbalanced line =

Where the impedance of the two conductor paths are not equal

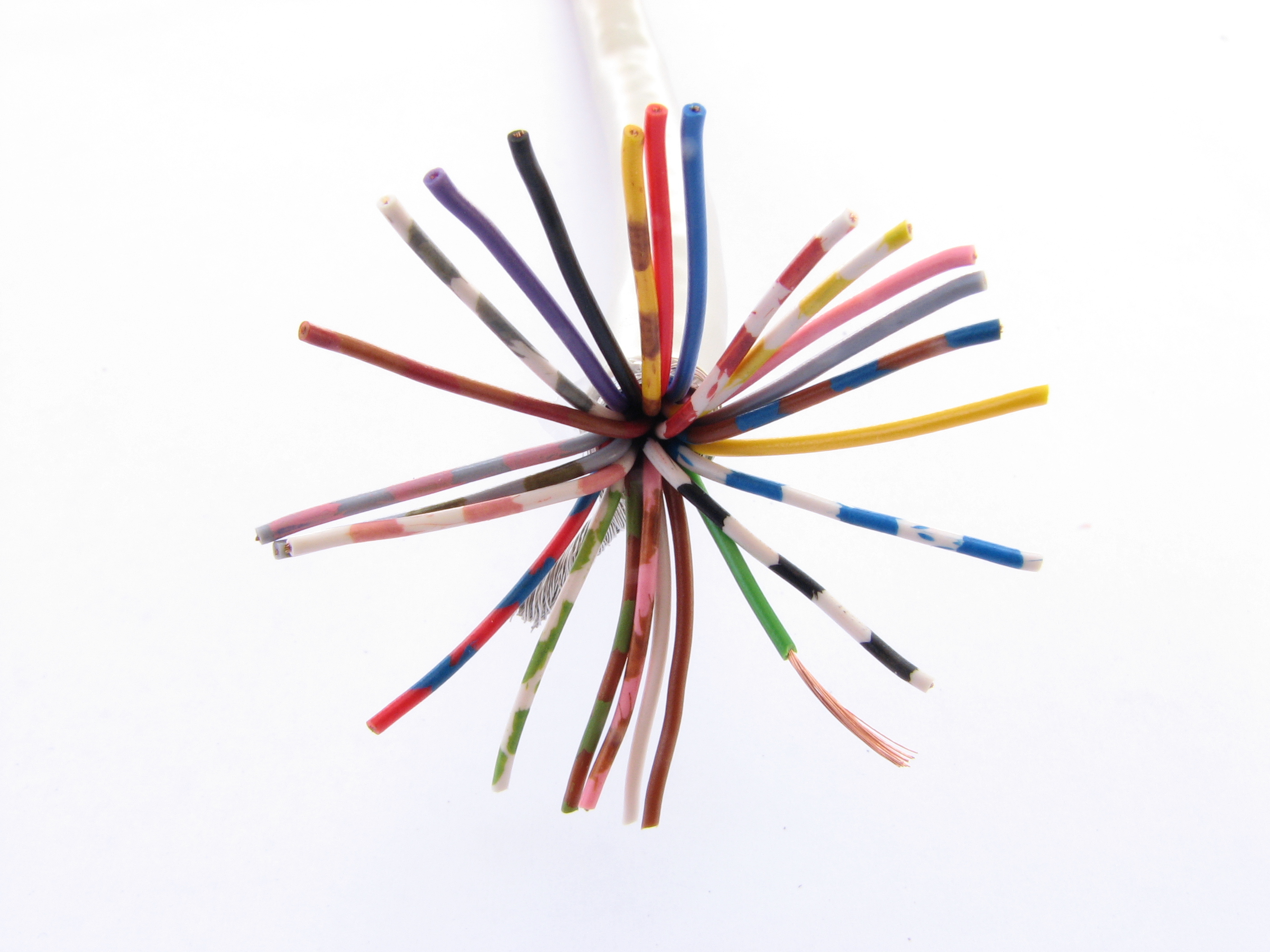
A multicore cable able to support 25 unbalanced transmission lines

In telecommunications and electrical engineering in general, an unbalanced line is a pair of conductors intended to carry electrical signals, which have unequal impedances along their lengths and to ground and other circuits. Examples of unbalanced lines are coaxial cable or the historic earth return system invented for the telegraph, but rarely used today. Unbalanced lines are to be contrasted with balanced lines, such as twin-lead or twisted pair which use two identical conductors to maintain impedance balance throughout the line. Balanced and unbalanced lines can be interfaced using a device called a balun.

The chief advantage of the unbalanced line format is cost efficiency. Multiple unbalanced lines can be provided in the same cable with one conductor per line plus a single common return conductor, typically the cable shielding. Likewise, multiple microstrip circuits can all use the same ground plane for the return path. This compares well with balanced cabling which requires two conductors for each line, nearly twice as many. Another benefit of unbalanced lines is that they do not require more expensive, balanced driver and receiver circuits to operate correctly.

Unbalanced lines are sometimes confused with single-ended signalling, but these are entirely separate concepts. The former is a cabling scheme while the latter is a signalling scheme. However, single-ended signalling is commonly sent over unbalanced lines. Unbalanced lines are not to be confused with single-wire transmission lines which do not use a return path at all.

== General description ==
Any line that has a different impedance of the return path may be considered an unbalanced line. However, unbalanced lines usually consist of a conductor that is considered the signal line and another conductor that is grounded, or is ground itself. The ground conductor often takes the form of a ground plane or the screen of a cable. The ground conductor may be, and often is, common to multiple independent circuits. For this reason the ground conductor may be referred to as common.

== Telegraph lines ==
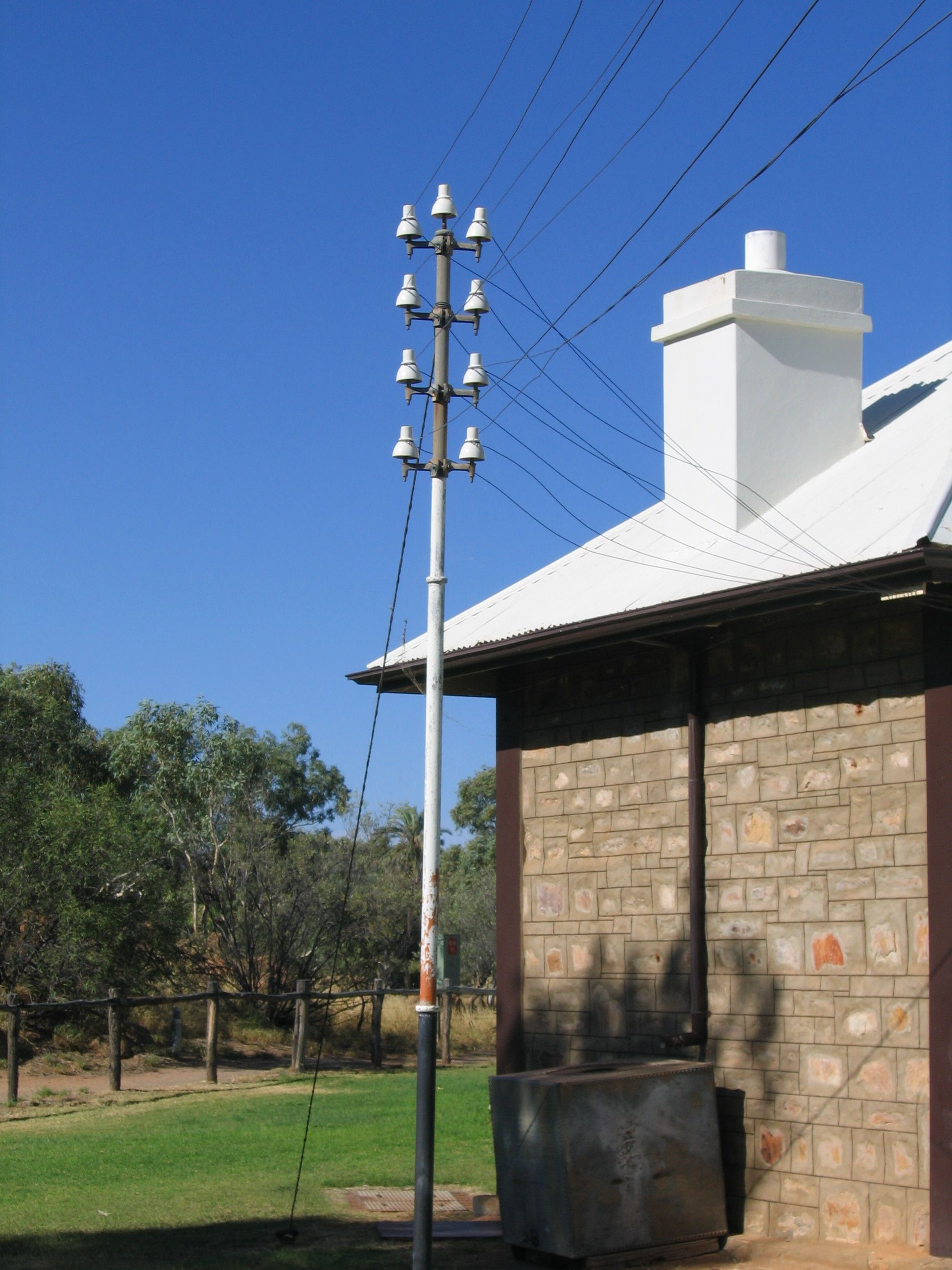
Telegraph lines on an Oppenheimer pole outside the historic Alice Springs telegraph station on the now disused Australian Overland Telegraph Line

The earliest use of unbalanced transmission lines was for electric telegraph communications. These consisted of single wires strung between poles. The return path for the current was originally provided by a separate conductor. Some early telegraph systems, such as Schilling's 1832 experimental needle telegraph and the 1837 Cooke & Wheatstone five-needle telegraph used by British railways required multiple code wires. Essentially, they were parallel bus coding. In these systems the cost of the return conductor was not so significant (one conductor in seven for Schilling's earliest needle telegraph and one conductor in six for the Cooke and Wheatstone telegraph) but the number of coding conductors was progressively reduced with improved systems. Soon only one coding wire was required with the data being transmitted serially. Important examples of these single-wire systems were the Morse telegraph (1837) and the Cooke & Wheatstone single-needle telegraph (1843). In such systems the cost of a return conductor was fully 50 per cent of the cable costs. It was discovered that a return conductor could be replaced with a return path through the Earth using grounding spikes. Using earth return was a significant cost saving and rapidly became the norm.

Underground telegraph cables into large buildings or between stations often needed to carry multiple independent telegraph lines. These cables took the form of multiple insulated conductors enclosed by a metal screen and overall protective jacket. In such cables the screen can be used as the return conductor. Undersea telegraph cables were usually a single conductor protected by steel-wire armour, effectively a coaxial cable. The first transatlantic cable of this kind was completed in 1866.

Early telephone lines (telephone invented 1876) used the same transmission line scheme as telegraph of unbalanced single wires. However, telephone communication started to suffer after the widespread introduction of electrical power lines. Telephone transmission started to use balanced lines to combat this problem and the modern norm for telephone presentation is the balanced twisted pair cable.

== Coaxial lines ==
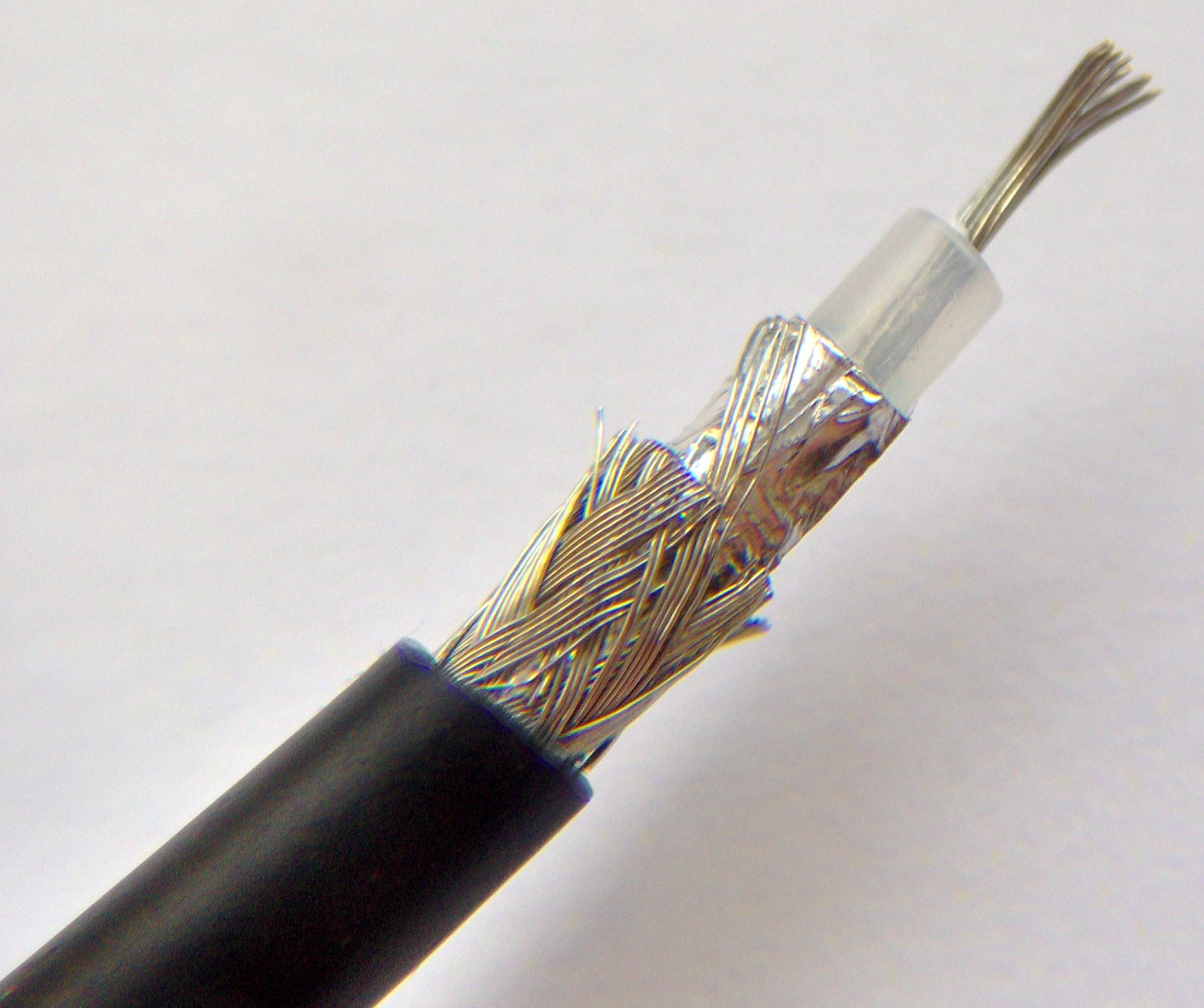
Coaxial cable

A coaxial line (coax) has a central signal conductor surrounded by a cylindrical shielding conductor. The shield conductor is normally grounded. The coaxial format was developed during World War II for use in radar. It was originally constructed from rigid copper pipes, but the usual form today is a flexible cable with a braided screen. The advantages of coax are a theoretically perfect electrostatic screen and highly predictable transmission parameters. The latter is a result of the fixed geometry of the format which leads to a precision not found with loose wires. Open wire systems are also affected by nearby objects altering the field pattern around the conductor. Coax does not suffer from this since the field is entirely contained within the cable due to the surrounding screen.

Coaxial lines are the norm for connections between radio transmitters and their antennae, for interconnection of electronic equipment where high frequency or above is involved, and were formerly widely used for forming local area networks before twisted pair became popular for this purpose.

Triaxial cable (triax) is a variant of coax with a second shield conductor surrounding the first with a layer of insulation in between. As well as providing additional shielding, the outer conductors can be used for other purposes such as providing power to equipment or control signals. Triax is widely used for the connection of cameras in television studios.

== Planar technologies ==
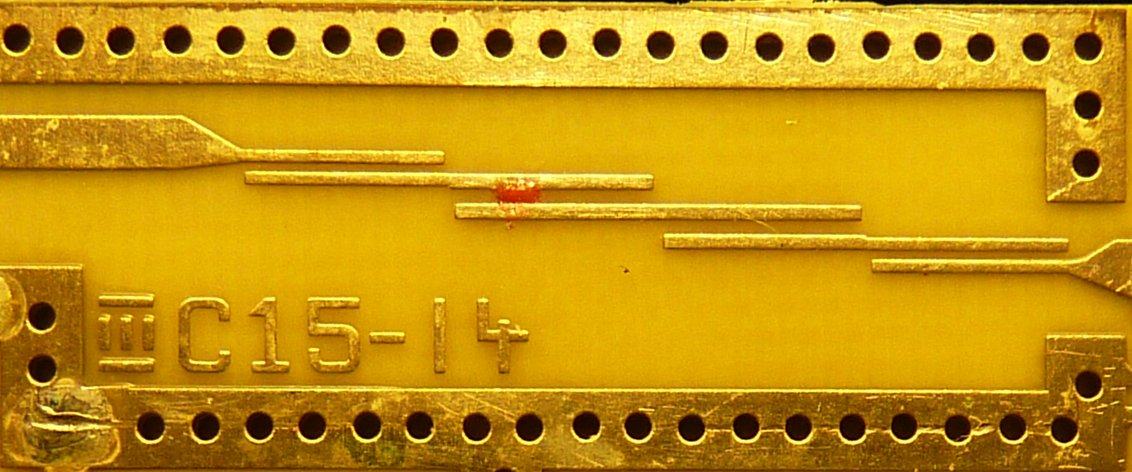
Microstrip parallel-coupled transmission lines. The design forms a band-pass filter

Planar format transmission lines are flat conductors manufactured by a number of techniques on to a substrate. They are nearly always an unbalanced format. At the low transmission speeds of early telegraph it was only necessary to consider transmission line theory for a circuit design when the transmission was over many miles. Similarly, the audio frequencies used by telephones are relatively low and transmission line theory only becomes significant for distances of at least between buildings. However, at the higher radio frequencies and microwave frequencies transmission line considerations can become important inside a device, just a matter of centimetres. At the very high data rates handled by modern computer processors, transmission line considerations can even be important inside an individual integrated circuit. Planar technologies were developed for these kinds of small size applications and are not very appropriate for long distance transmissions.

Stripline

Stripline is a flat conductor with a ground plane both above and below the conductor. The variant of stripline where the space between the two ground planes is completely filled with a dielectric material is sometimes known as triplate. Stripline can be manufactured by etching the transmission line pattern on to a printed circuit board. The bottom of this board is left completely covered in copper and forms the bottom ground plane. A second board is clamped on top of the first. This second board has no pattern on the bottom and plain copper on the top to form the top ground plane. A sheet of copper foil may be wrapped around the two boards to electrically bond the two ground planes firmly together. On the other hand, stripline for high power applications such as radar will more likely be made as solid metal strips with periodic dielectric supports, essentially air dielectric.

Microstrip

Microstrip is similar to stripline but is open above the conductor. There is no dielectric or ground plane above the transmission line, there is only dielectric and a ground plane below the line. Microstrip is a popular format, especially in domestic products, because microstrip components can be made using the established manufacturing techniques of printed circuit boards. Designers are thus able to mix discrete component circuits with microstrip components. Furthermore, since the board has to be made anyway, the microstrip components have no additional manufacturing cost. For applications where performance is more important than cost a ceramic substrate might be used instead of a printed circuit. Microstrip has another small advantage over stripline; the line widths are wider in microstrip for the same impedance and thus manufacturing tolerances and minimum width are less critical on high-impedance lines. A drawback of microstrip is that the mode of transmission is not entirely transverse. Strictly speaking, standard transmission line analysis does not apply because other modes are present, but it can be a usable approximation.

Integrated circuits

Connections within integrated circuits are normally planar so planar transmission lines are a natural choice where these are needed. The need for transmission lines is most frequently found in microwave integrated circuits (MICs). There are a great many materials and techniques used to make MICs, and transmission lines can be formed in any of these technologies.

Planar transmission lines are used for far more than merely connecting components or units together. They can themselves be used as components and units. Any transmission line format can be used in this way, but for the planar formats it is often their primary purpose. Typical circuit blocks implemented by transmission lines include filters, directions couplers and power splitters, and impedance matching. At microwave frequencies discrete components need to be impractically small and a transmission line solution is the only viable one. On the other hand, at low frequencies such as audio applications, transmission line devices need to be impractically large.

== Power transmission ==
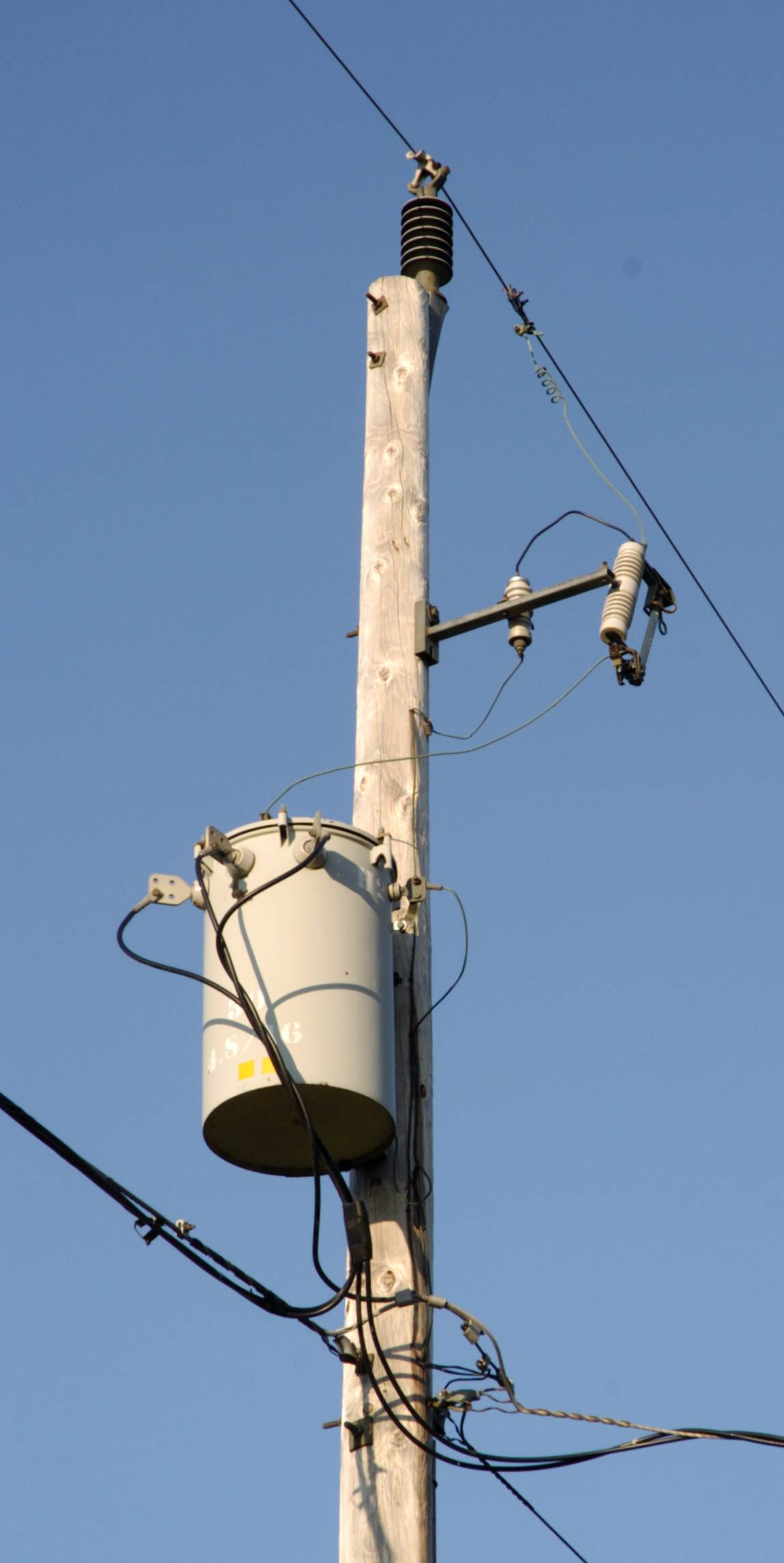
A pole-mount transformer on a single-wire earth return line in Canada

Electric power distribution is normally in the form of balanced three-phase transmission. However, in some remote locations where a relatively small amount of power is required, a single-wire earth return system may be used.

== Bibliography ==
- Huurdeman, Anton A., The Worldwide History of Telecommunications, John Wiley & Sons, 2003 ISBN 0471205052.
- Curran, J.E.; Jeanes, R.; Sewell, H, "A Technology of Thin-Film Hybrid Microwave Circuits", IEEE Transactions on Parts, Hybrids, and Packaging, vol. 12, iss. 4, December 1976.
