= Earth-return telegraph =

Telegraphy transmission method

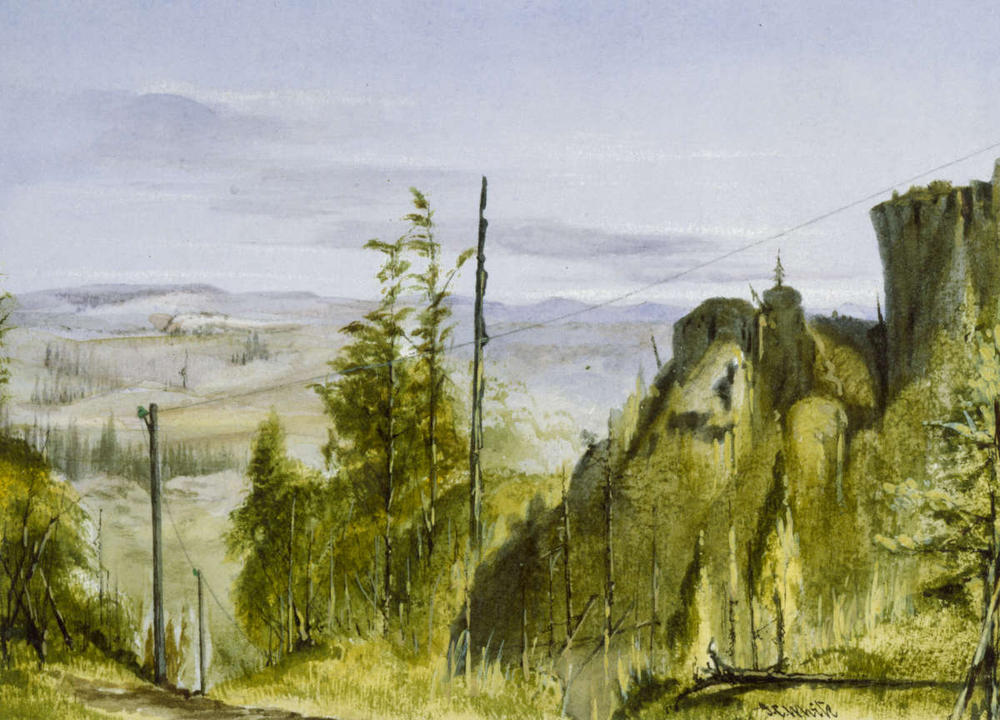
Part of the Russian–American Telegraph line bearing the single wire of an earth-return circuit, c. 1866

Earth-return telegraph is the system whereby the return path for the electric current of a telegraph circuit is provided by connection to the earth through an earth electrode. Using earth return saves a great deal of money on installation costs since it halves the amount of wire that is required, with a corresponding saving on the labour required to string it. The benefits of doing this were not immediately noticed by telegraph pioneers, but it rapidly became the norm after the first earth-return telegraph was put into service by Carl August von Steinheil in 1838.

Earth-return telegraph began to have problems towards the end of the 19th century due to the introduction of electric trams. These seriously disturbed earth-return operation and some circuits were returned to the old metal-conductor return system. At the same time, the rise of telephony, which was even more intolerant to the interference on earth-return systems, started to displace electrical telegraphy altogether, bringing to an end the earth-return technique in telecommunications.

== Description ==
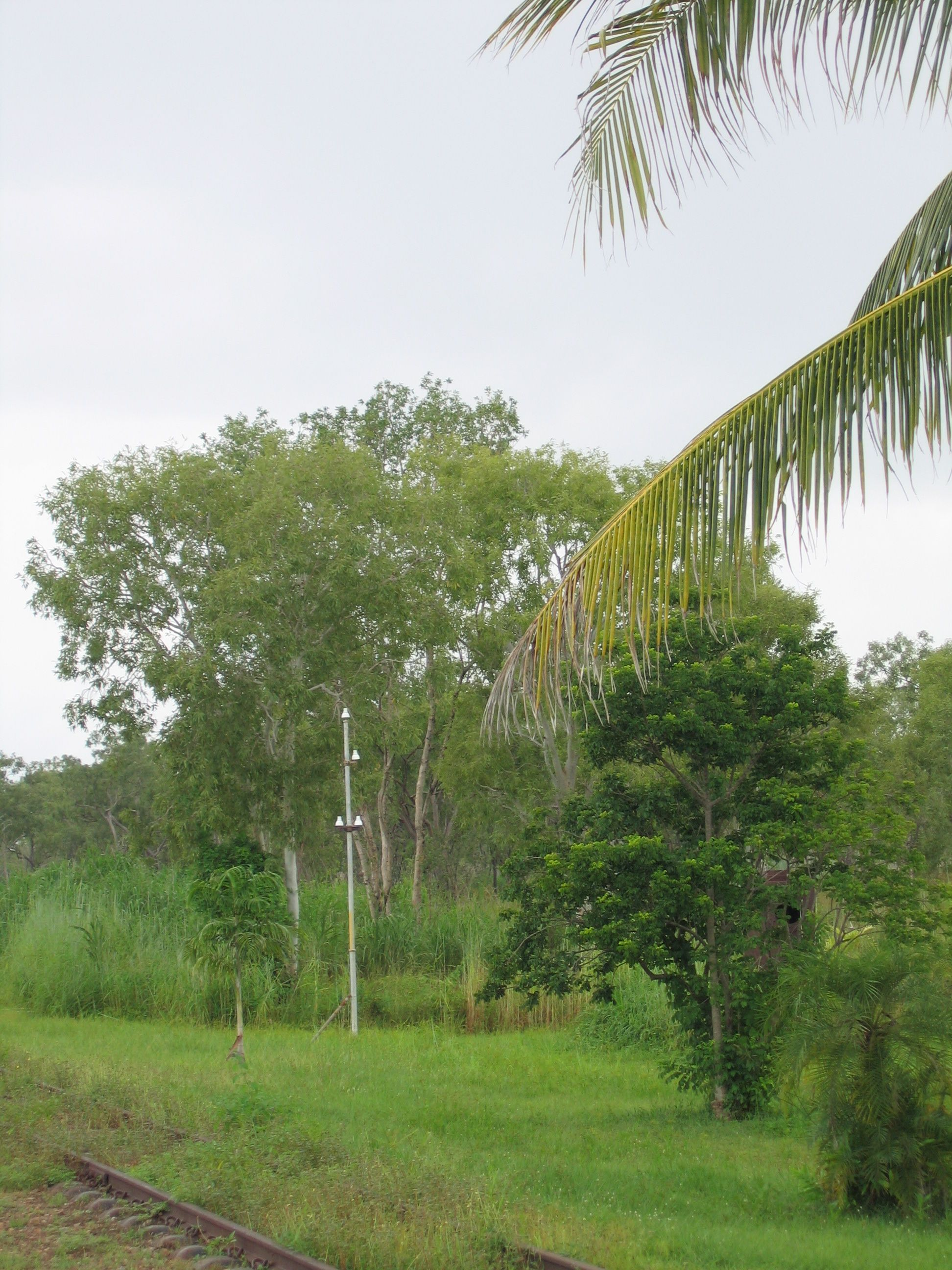
A disused pole of the Australian Overland Telegraph Line which used to carry four lines using an earth-return

A telegraph line between two telegraph offices, like all electrical circuits, requires two conductors to form a complete circuit. This usually means two distinct metal wires in the circuit, but in the earth-return circuit one of these is replaced by connections to earth (also called ground) to complete the circuit. Connection to earth is made by means of metal plates with a large surface area buried deeply in the ground. These plates could be made of copper or galvanised iron. Other methods include connecting to metal gas or water pipes where these are available, or laying a long wire rope on damp ground. The latter method is not very reliable, but was common in India up to 1868.

Soil has much higher resistivity compared to copper wires, but the Earth is such a large body that it effectively forms a conductor with an enormous cross-sectional area and high conductance. It is only necessary to ensure that there is good contact with the Earth at the two stations. To do this, the earth plates must be buried deep enough to always be in contact with moist soil. In arid areas this can be problematic. Operators were sometimes instructed to pour water on the earth plates to maintain connection. The plates must also be large enough to pass sufficient current. For the ground circuit to have a conductance as good as the conductor it replaces, the surface area of the plate is made larger than the cross-sectional area of the conductor by the same factor as the resistivity of the ground exceeds the resistivity of copper, or whatever other metal is being used for the wire.

== Reason for use ==
The advantage of the earth-return system is that it reduces the amount of metal wire that would otherwise be required, a substantial saving on long telegraph lines that may run for hundreds, or even thousands, of miles. This advantage was not so apparent in early telegraph systems which often required multiple signal wires. All of the circuits in such a system could use the same single return conductor (unbalanced lines), so the cost saving would have been minimal. Examples of multiwire systems included Pavel Schilling's experimental system in 1832, which had six signal wires so that the Cyrillic alphabet could be binary coded, and the Cooke and Wheatstone five-needle telegraph in 1837. The latter did not require a return conductor at all because the five signal wires were always used in pairs with opposite polarity currents until code points for numerals were added.

The expense of multiwire systems rapidly led to single-signal-wire systems becoming the norm for long-distance telegraph. Around the time earth return was introduced, the two most widely used systems were the Morse system of Samuel Morse (from 1844) and the Cooke and Wheatstone one-needle telegraph (from 1843). A few two-signal-wire systems lingered on; the Cooke and Wheatstone two-needle system used on British railways, and the Foy-Breguet telegraph used in France. With the reduction in the number of signal wires, the cost of the return wire was much more significant, leading to earth return becoming the standard.

Electromagnetic telegraphs wires over time
Telegraph system	Number of wires required or proposed
Steinheil (1838)	1
Cooke and Wheatstone (1837)	5
Schilling (1832)	8
Sömmerring (1809)	35
Ritchie (1830)	52
Ampère (1820)	60

Sömmerring's telegraph was an electrochemical, rather than an electromagnetic telegraph and is placed out of chronological order. It is shown here for comparison because it directly inspired Schilling's electromagnetic telegraph, but Schilling used a greatly reduced number of wires.

== History ==
=== Early experiments ===
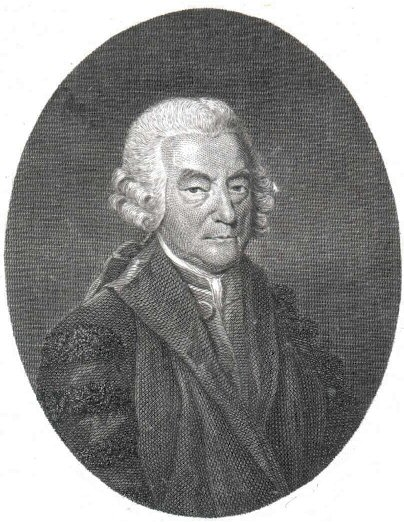
William Watson established the viability of earth return

The first use of an earth return to complete an electric circuit was by William Watson in 1747 excluding experiments using a water return path. Watson, in a demonstration on Shooter's Hill, London, sent an electric current through 2,800 feet of iron wire, insulated with baked wood, with an earth-return path. Later that year he increased that distance to two miles. One of the first demonstrations of a water-return path was by John Henry Winkler, (Note: Full name found from Philosophical Transactions of the Royal Society of London, vol. 9 (1744–1749), p. 494.) a professor in Leipzig, who used the River Pleisse in this way in an experiment on 28 July 1746. The first experimenter to test an earth-return circuit with a low-voltage battery rather than a high-voltage friction machine was Basse of Hameln in 1803. These early experiments were not aimed at producing a telegraph, but rather, were designed to determine the speed of electricity. In the event, the transmission of electrical signals proved to be faster than the experimenters were able to measure – indistinguishable from instantaneous.

Watson's result seems to have been unknown, or forgotten, by early telegraph experimenters who used a return conductor to complete the circuit. One early exception was a telegraph invented by Harrison Gray Dyar in 1826 using friction machines. Dyar demonstrated this telegraph around a race course on Long Island, New York, in 1828 using an earth-return circuit. The demonstration was an attempt to get backing for construction of a New York to Philadelphia line, but the project was unsuccessful (and is unlikely to have worked over a long distance), Dyar was quickly forgotten, and earth return had to be reinvented yet again.

=== First earth-return telegraph ===
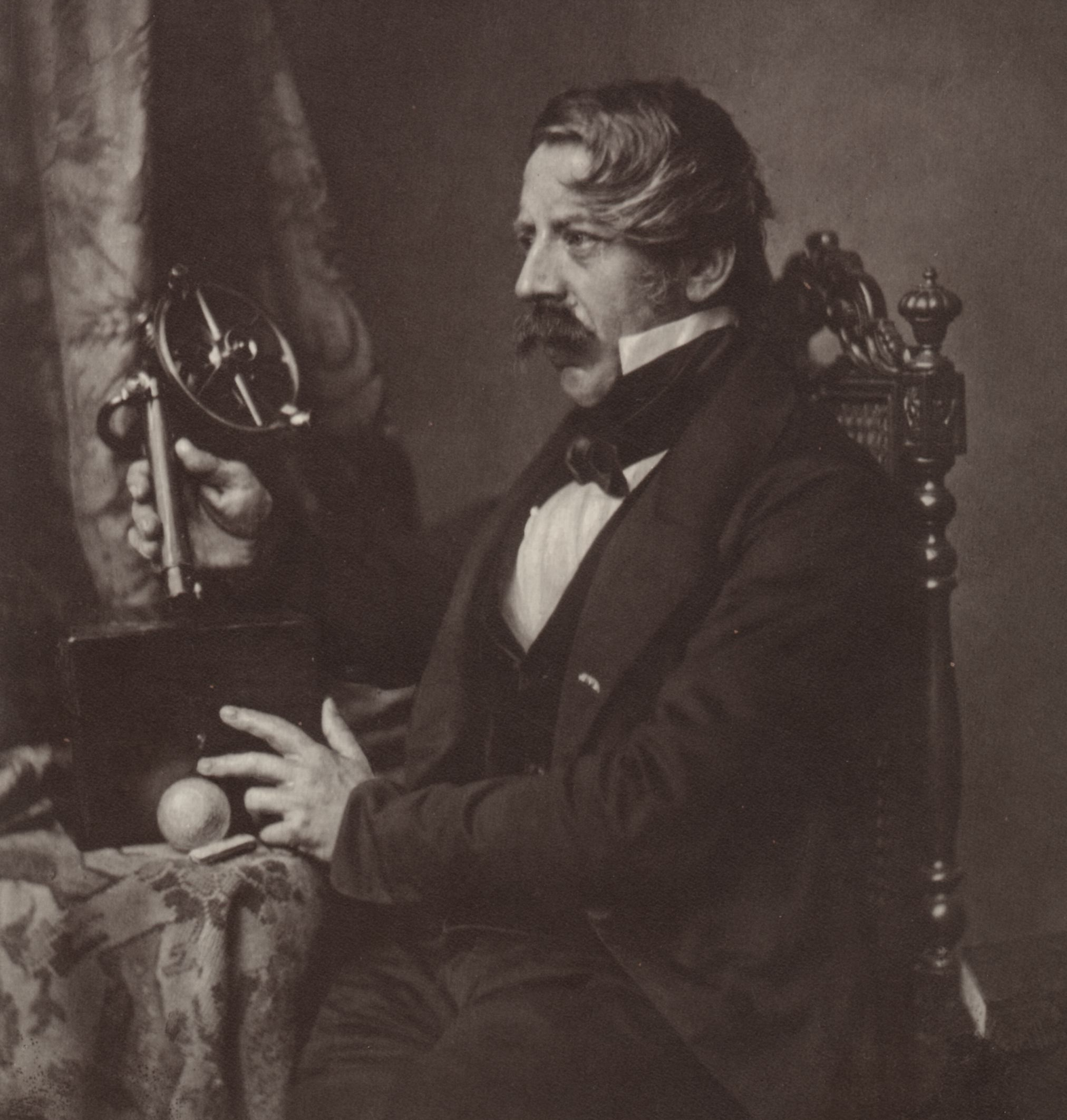
Carl August von Steinheil was the first to put an earth-return telegraph into service

The first telegraph put into service with an earth return is due to Carl August von Steinheil in 1838. Steinheil's discovery was independent of earlier work and he is often, inaccurately, cited as the inventor of the principle. Steinheil was working on providing a telegraph along the Nuremberg–Fürth railway line, a distance of five miles. Steinheil first attempted, at the suggestion of Carl Friedrich Gauss, to use the two rails of the track as the telegraph conductors. This failed because the rails were not well insulated from earth and there was consequently a conducting path between them. However, this initial failure made Steinheil realise that the earth could be used as a conductor and he then succeeded with only one wire and an earth return.

Steinheil realised that the "galvanic excitation" in the earth was not confined to the direct route between the two ends of the telegraph wire, but extended outwards indefinitely. He speculated that this might mean that telegraphy without any wires at all was possible; he may have been the first to consider wireless telegraphy as a real possibility. He succeeded in transmitting a signal 50 feet by electromagnetic induction, but this distance was not of practical use.

The use of earth-return circuits rapidly became the norm, helped along by Steinheil declining to patent the idea – he wished to make it freely available as a public service on his part. However, Samuel Morse was not immediately aware of Steinheil's discovery when he installed the first telegraph line in the United States in 1844 using two copper wires. Earth return became so ubiquitous that some telegraph engineers appear not to have realised that early telegraphs all used return wires. In 1856, a couple of decades after the introduction of earth return, Samuel Statham of the Gutta Percha Company and Wildman Whitehouse tried to patent a return wire and got as far as provisional protection.

=== Problems with electric power ===
The introduction of electric power, especially electric tram lines in the 1880s, seriously disturbed earth-return telegraph lines. The starting and stopping of the trams generated large electromagnetic spikes which overwhelmed code pulses on telegraph lines. That was particularly a problem on lines where high-speed automatic working was in use and, most especially, on submarine telegraph cables. The latter type could be thousands of miles long and the arriving signal was consequently small. On land, repeaters in the line would be used to regenerate the signal, but they were not available for submarine cables until the middle of the 20th century. Sensitive instruments like the syphon recorder were used to detect weak signals on long submarine cables, and they were easily disrupted by trams.

The problem caused by electric trams was so severe in some places that it led to the reintroduction of return conductors. A return conductor following the same path as the main conductor will have the same interference induced in it. Such common-mode interference can be entirely removed if both parts of the circuit are identical (a balanced line). One such case of interference occurred in 1897 in Cape Town, South Africa. The disruption was so great that not only was the buried cable through the city replaced with a balanced line, but a balanced submarine cable was laid for five or six nautical miles out to sea, where it was spliced on to the original cable.

The advent of telephony, which initially used the same earth-return lines used by telegraphy, made it essential to use balanced circuits, because telephone lines were even more susceptible to interference. One of the first to realise that all-metal circuits would solve the severe noise problems encountered on earth-return telephone circuits was John J. Carty, the future chief engineer of the American Telephone and Telegraph Company. Carty began installing metallic returns on lines under his control and reported that the noises immediately disappeared almost entirely.

== See also ==
- Single-wire earth return, used for electric power distribution.

== Bibliography ==
- Artemenko, Roman, "Pavel Schilling - inventor of the electromagnetic telegraph", PC Week, vol. 3, iss. 321, 29 January 2002 (in Russian).
- Brooks, David, "Indian and American telegraphs", Journal of the Society of Telegraph Engineers, vol. 3, pp. 115–125, 1874.
- Burns, Russel W., Communications: An International History of the Formative Years, IEE, 2004 ISBN 0863413277.
- Calvert, James B., The Electromagnetic Telegraph, retrieved 14 April 2020.
- Commissioners of Patents, Patents for Inventions: Abridgements of Specifications Relating to Electricity and Magnetism, Their Generation and Applications, George E. Eyre and William Spottiswoode, 1859. Statham and Whitehouse's claim for a return wire is on page 584.
- Darling, Charles R., "Field telephones", The Electrical Review, vol. 77, no. 1,973, pp. 377–379, 17 September 1915.
- Fahie, John Joseph, A History of Wireless Telegraphy, 1838–1899, Edingburgh and London: William Blackwood and Sons, 1899 LCCN 01-5391.
- Fleming, John Ambrose, The Principles of Electric Wave Telegraphy, London: Longmans, 1910 OCLC 561016618.
- Hawks, Ellison, "Pioneers of wireless", Wireless World, vol. 18, nos. 9 & 11, pp. 343–344, 421–422, 3 & 17 March 1926.
- Hendrick, Burton J., The Age of Big Business, Cosimo, 2005 ISBN 1596050675.
- Hubbard, Geoffrey, Cooke and Wheatstone and the Invention of the Electric Telegraph, Routledge, 2013 ISBN 1135028508.
- Huurdeman, Anton A., The Worldwide History of Telecommunications, Wiley, 2003 ISBN 9780471205050.
- Kahn, Douglas, Earth Sound Earth Signal: Energies and Earth Magnitude in the Arts, University of California Press, 2013 ISBN 0520257804.
- King, W. James, "The development of electrical technology in the 19th century: The telegraph and the telephone", pp. 273–332 in, Contributions from the Museum of History and Technology: Papers 19–30, Smithsonian Institution, 1963 OCLC 729945946.
- Margalit, Harry, Energy, Cities and Sustainability, Routledge, 2016 ISBN 1317528166.
- Prescott, George Bartlett, History, Theory, and Practice of the Electric Telegraph, Boston: Ticknor and Fields, 1866 LCCN 17-10907.
- Schwendler, Louis, Instructions for Testing Telegraph Lines and the Technical Arrangements of Offices, vol. 2, London: Trèubner & Co., 1878 OCLC 637561329
- Shiers, George, The Electric Telegraph: An Historical Anthology, Arno Press, 1977 OCLC 1067753076.
- Stachurski, Richard, Longitude by Wire: Finding North America, University of South Carolina, 2009 ISBN 1570038015.
- Trotter, A.P., "Disturbance of submarine cable working by electric tramways", Journal of the Institution of Electrical Engineers, vol. 26, iss. 130, pp. 501–514, July 1897.
  - "Discussion of Mr. Trotter's paper", op. cit., pp. 515–532.
- Wheen, Andrew, Dot-Dash to Dot.Com: How Modern Telecommunications Evolved from the Telegraph to the Internet, Springer, 2010 ISBN 1441967605.
