= Carl August von Steinheil =

Alsatian physicist (1801–1870)

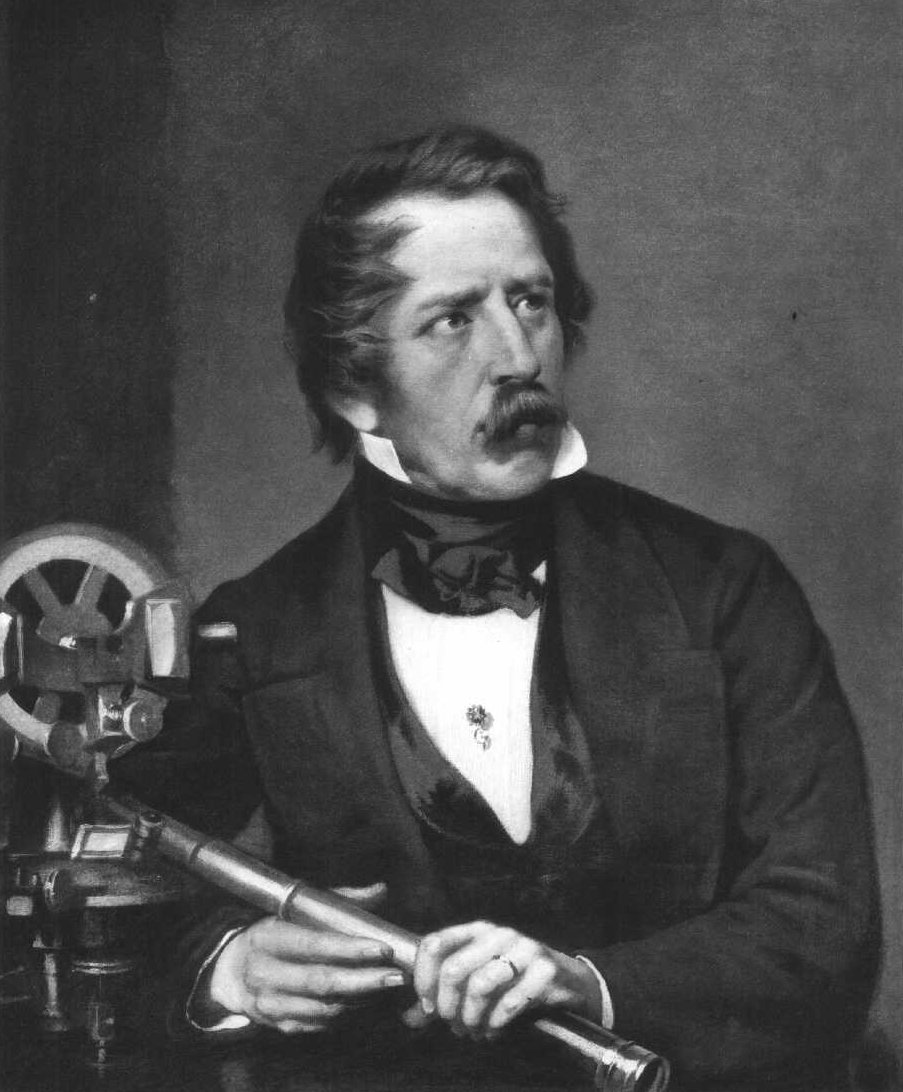
- Born: 12 October 1801; Ribeauvillé, Alsace, France
- Died: 14 September 1870 (aged 68); Munich, Bavaria
- Resting place: Alter Südfriedhof, Munich; 48.127222°N 11.565°E
- Citizenship: Bavarian
- Education: University of Erlangen
- Known for: Steinheil doublet Earth-return telegraph Ground (electricity)
- Scientific career
- Fields: Astronomy, Physics, Engineering, Mathematics
- Workplaces: Ludwig-Maximilians-Universität München; Austrian Trade Ministry; C. A. Steinheil & Söhne; Deutsch-Österreichischer Telegraphenverein; Trade Ministry of Bavaria

Carl August von Steinheil (12 October 1801 – 14 September 1870) was an Alsatian physicist, inventor, engineer and astronomer.

== Biography ==
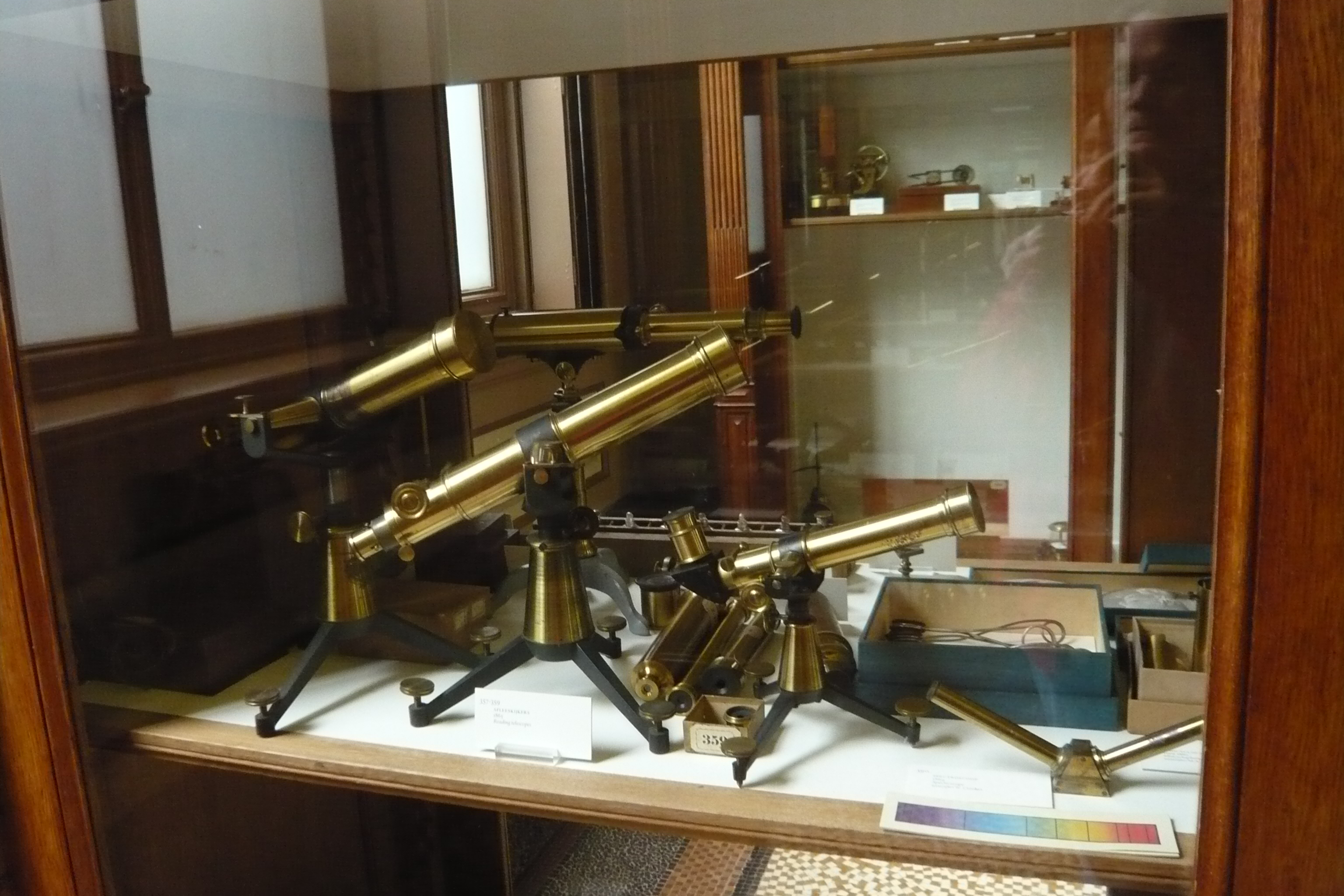
Reading telescopes by C.A. Steinheil purchased in 1865 on display in the Teylers Instrument Room

Steinheil was born in Ribeauvillé, Alsace. He studied law in Erlangen since 1821. He then studied astronomy in Göttingen and Königsberg. He continued his studies in astronomy and physics while living in his father's manor in Perlachseck near Munich. From 1832 to 1849, Steinheil was professor for mathematics and physics at the Ludwig-Maximilians-Universität München.

In July 1839, Steinheil demonstrated a photographic process at Nymphenburg Palace in the presence of Queen Therese. Several photographs had been exhibited by Steinheil throughout April and Summer 1839. The process has been commonly attributed to Steinheil, but research published in 2024 revealed that the earliest paper negatives had actually been created by Wolfgang Franz von Kobell in 1837, without any involvement of Steinheil.

Steinheil was one of the first to use the daguerreotype in Germany. By December 1839, he made the first portable metal camera in the world. It was nineteen times smaller than the camera sold by Daguerre. At least ten of these cameras were manufactured.

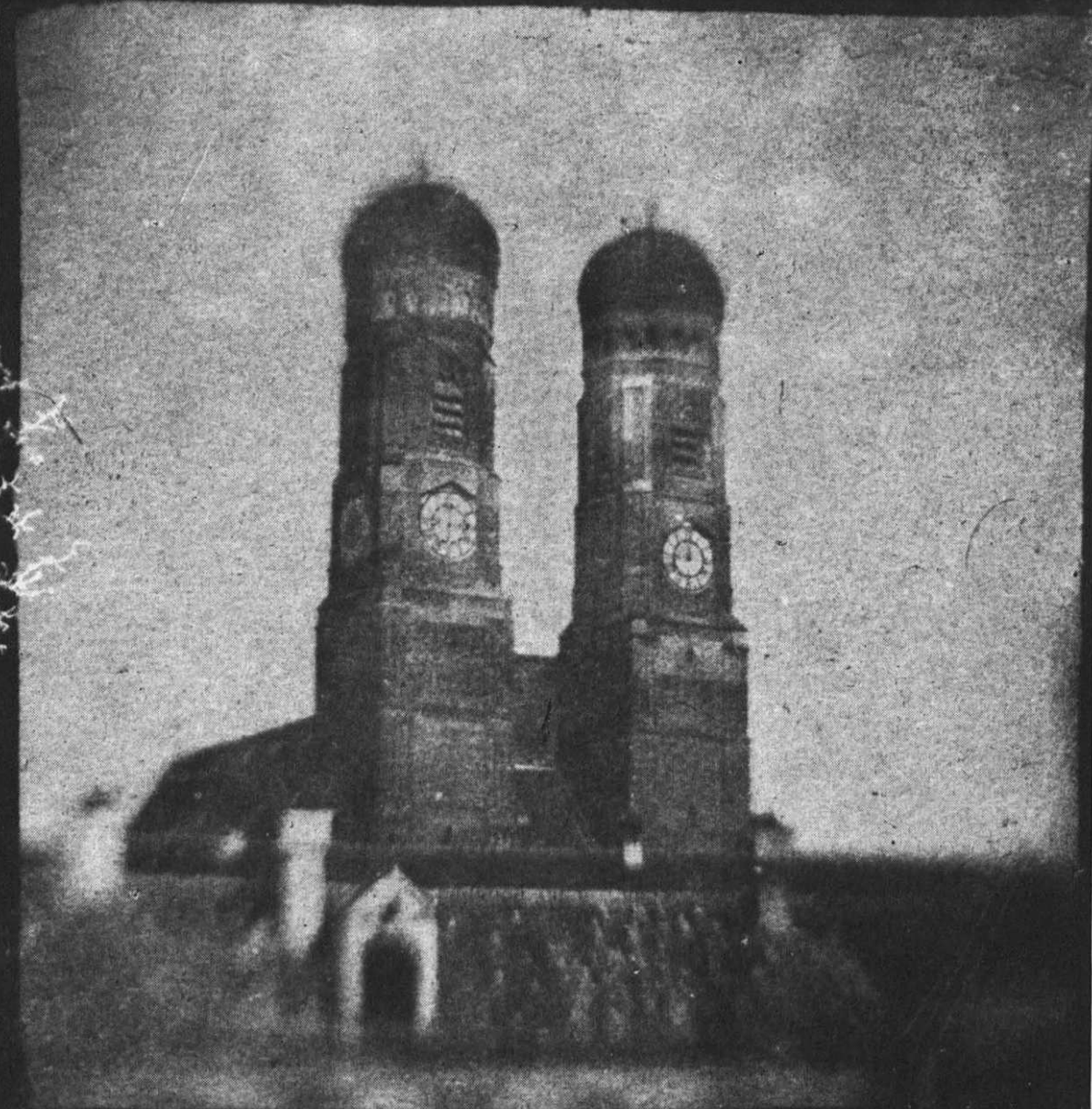
Kobell's silver chloride photograph of Frauenkirche from the Old Academy, March 1837

In 1846, Steinheil travelled to Naples to install a new system for weight and measure units. Three years later, he was appointed to the Board of Telegraphy of the Austrian Trade Ministry. Steinheil was tasked with designing a telegraph network for the entire empire, and helped to form the Deutsch-Österreichischer Telegraphenverein (German-Austrian Telegraph Society). In 1851, he started the Swiss telegraph network. Steinheil returned Munich as konservator (curator) of the mathematical-physical collections and ministerial secretary in the Trade Ministry of Bavaria.

In 1854, he founded C. A. Steinheil & Söhne, an optical-astronomical company. The company built telescopes, spectroscopes and photometers – one of Steinheil's inventions, used to measure brightness. C.A. Steinheil & Söhne produced large telescopes for observatories in Uppsala, Mannheim, Leipzig, Utrecht. The company also produced refractors and reflectors with silver-covered mirrors. The process for creating the silvering was developed by Steinheil's friend Justus Liebig.

In 1862, Steinheil's sons started managing the company. His great granddaughter Elsbeth Steinheil, through his son Hugo Adolph, and grandson Rudolf (1865-1930), worked for the company after graduating as the first female mechanical engineer in Germany in 1917.

Steinheil died in Munich in Bavaria on 14 September 1870. He was buried in the Alter Südfriedhof cemetery.

== Inventions ==
- Ground electricity
- Print telegraph (not made public)
- Electric clock
- Steinheil script (code to print dots on paper via telegraph, not used due to the adoption of Morse code)
- Photographic process on silver chloride paper (together with Franz von Kobell)
- Steinheil doublet, a flint-first achromatic doublet
- Silver coating of curved glass surfaces (together with Léon Foucault) paving the way for the rise of reflecting telescopes.

== Legacy ==
Some sources state that Steinheilite, a transparent mineral that resembles blue quartz but is actually a form of iolite, was named after Carl von Steinheil. However, the name was in use as early as 1811, too early to be named after Carl von Steinheil, and sources from that time instead attribute it to Fabian Steinheil, the Russian military governor of Finland.

== See also ==
- Needle telegraph
