= Louis Clément François Breguet =

French physicist and watchmaker (1804–1883)

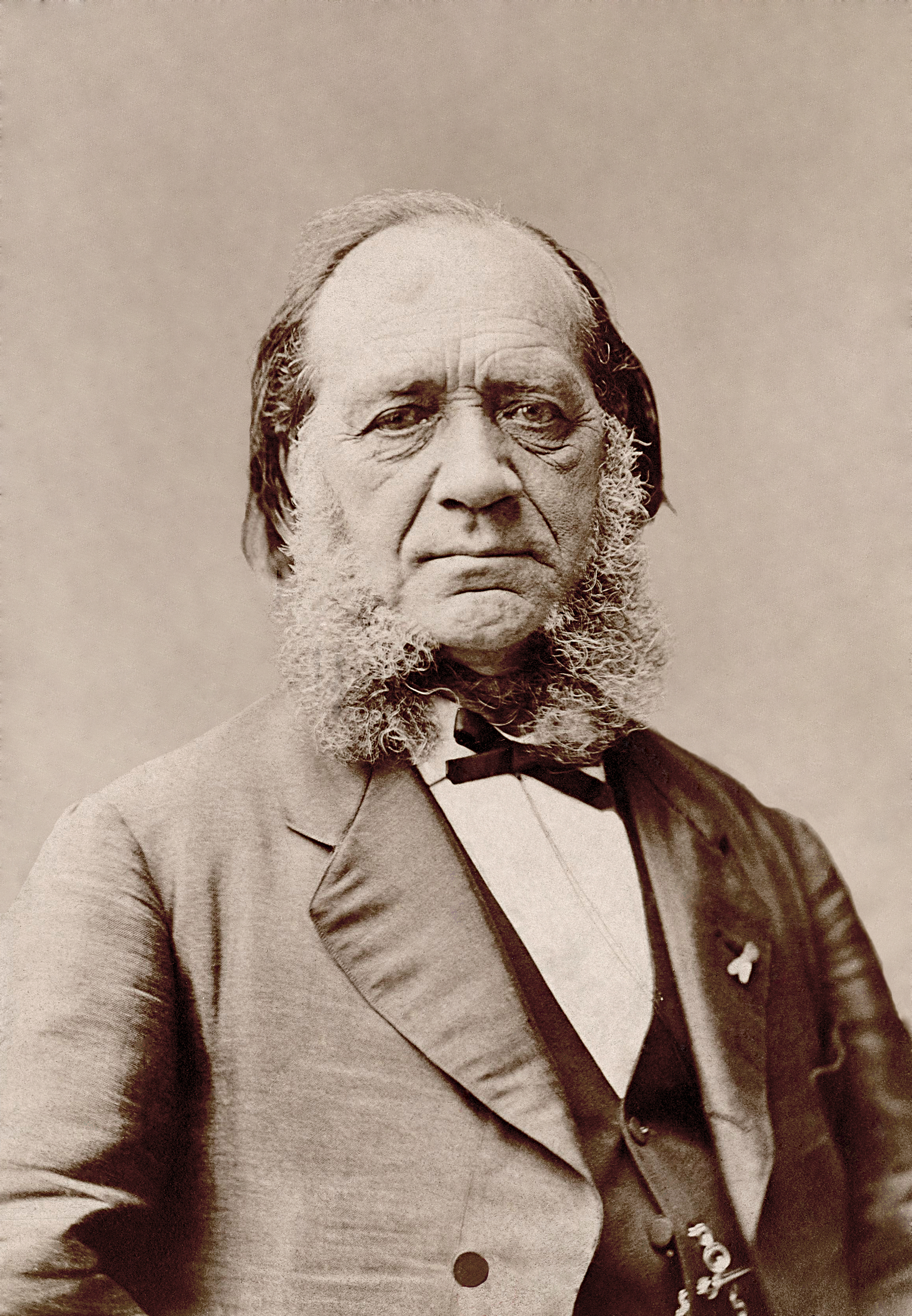
Louis Breguet, 1804–1883 by Nadar

Louis Clément François Breguet (English: /brɛˈɡeɪ/, French: [lwi klemɑ̃ fʁɑ̃swa bʁeɡɛ]; 22 December 1804 – 27 October 1883) was a French physicist and watchmaker, noted for his work in the early days of telegraphy.

Educated in Switzerland, Breguet was the grandson of Abraham-Louis Breguet, founder of the watch manufacturing company Breguet. He became manager of Breguet et Fils watchmakers in 1833 after his father Louis Antoine Breguet retired.

Between 1835 and 1840 he standardized the company product line of watches, then making 350 watches per year, and diversified into scientific instruments, electrical devices, recording instruments, an electric thermometer, telegraph instruments and electrically synchronized clocks. With Alphonse Foy, in 1842 he developed the Foy-Breguet telegraph, an electrical needle telegraph to replace the optical telegraph system then in use. and a later step-by-step telegraph system (1847) was applied to French railways and exported to Japan. He observed in 1847 that small wires could be used to protect telegraph installations from lightning, the ancestor of the fuse.

In 1850 he manufactured a rotating mirror used by Hippolyte Fizeau to measure the relative speed of light in air and water. In 1856 he designed a public network of synchronized electric clocks for the center of Lyon. In 1866 he patented an electric clock controlled by a 100 Hz tuning fork.

In 1870 he transferred the leadership of the company to Edward Brown. Breguet then focused entirely on the telegraph and the nascent field of telecommunications. He collaborated in the development of an induction coil, later improved by Heinrich Ruhmkorff.

In terms of honors, in 1843 he was appointed to the Bureau of Longitudes. In 1845 Breguet was awarded the Legion d'Honneur. He was made a member of the French Academy of Sciences in 1874, and was elevated to Officer of the Legion d'Honneur in 1877. He is one of the 72 French scientists whose names are written around the base of the Eiffel Tower.

Breguet was married and had one son Antoine (1851–1882) who also joined the family electrical business. With his son, he met Alexander Graham Bell and obtained a license to manufacture Bell telephones for the French market. He was the grandfather of Louis Charles Breguet and the uncle of Sophie Berthelot.
