= William Ritchie (physicist) =

British physicist (1790–1837)

William Ritchie (1790?–1837) was a Scottish physicist. He was noted as an ingenious experimentalist.

== Early life ==
Born about 1790, he was educated for the Church of Scotland, and was licensed to preach; but he abandoned the church for the teaching profession. He became rector of the Royal Academy of Tain, in Ross-shire. After saving a little money, he provided a substitute to perform his duties, and went to Paris. There he attended the lectures of Louis Jacques Thénard, Joseph Louis Gay-Lussac, and Jean-Baptiste Biot. He soon acquired skill in devising and performing experiments in natural philosophy.

== Career ==
Ritchie's publications led to his appointment to the professorship of natural philosophy at the Royal Institution, where he delivered a course of probationary lectures in 1829. In 1832 he was appointed professor of natural philosophy in London University.

Ritchie was subsequently engaged on experiments on the manufacture of glass for optical purposes, and a commission was appointed by the government to inquire into his results. A telescope of eight inches aperture was constructed by John Dollond from Ritchie's glass, at the recommendation of the commission, but its performance was not very satisfactory (it is unrelated to the later Ritchey–Chrétien telescope).

== Death ==
Ritchie died on 15 September 1837 of a fever caught in Scotland.

== Works ==
He became known to Sir John Herschel, and through him he communicated to the Royal Society papers On a New Photometer, On a New Form of the Differential Thermometer, and On the Permeability of Transparent Screens of Extreme Tenuity by Radiant Heat. Shortly afterwards he published two small treatises on geometry (1833; 3rd edit. 1853) and the differential and integral calculus (1836; 2nd edit. 1847). He communicated to the Royal Society—of which he was elected a fellow—papers On the Elasticity of Threads of Glass and the Application of this Property to Torsion Balances, and also experimental researches on the electric and chemical theories of galvanism, on electromagnetism, and voltaic electricity.

His papers contributed to the Philosophical Magazine are in vols. i.–xii.

== See also ==
- Electrical telegraph
- Needle telegraph
- Rotor (electric)
