= Cooke and Wheatstone telegraph =

1830s electrical telegraph system

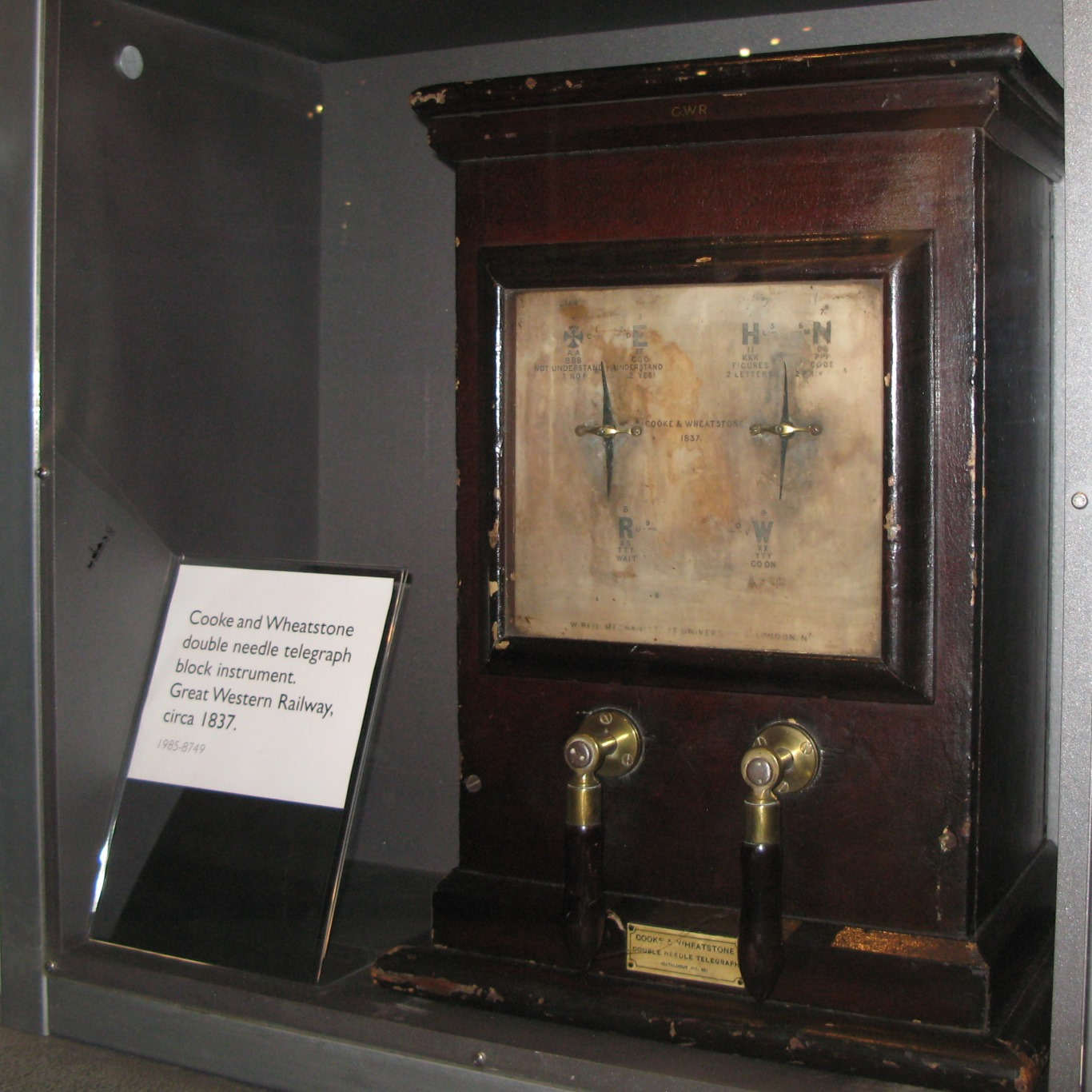
Cooke and Wheatstone's two-needle telegraph as used on the Great Western Railway

The Cooke and Wheatstone telegraph was an early electrical telegraph system dating from the 1830s invented by English inventor William Fothergill Cooke and English scientist Charles Wheatstone. It was a form of needle telegraph, and the first telegraph system to be put into commercial service. The receiver consisted of a number of needles that could be moved by electromagnetic coils to point to letters on a board. This feature was liked by early users who were unwilling to learn codes, and employers who did not want to invest in staff training.

In later systems, the letter board was dispensed with, and the code was read directly from the movement of the needles. This occurred because the number of needles was reduced, leading to more complex codes. The change was motivated by the economic need to reduce the number of telegraph wires used, which was related to the number of needles. The change became more urgent as the insulation of some of the early installations deteriorated, causing some of the original wires to be unusable. Cooke and Wheatstone's most successful system was eventually a one-needle system that continued in service into the 1930s.

Cooke and Wheatstone's telegraph played a part in the apprehension of the murderer John Tawell. Once it was known that Tawell had boarded a train to London, the telegraph was used to signal ahead to the terminus at Paddington and have him arrested there. The novelty of this use of the telegraph in crime-fighting generated a great deal of publicity and led to increased public acceptance and use of the telegraph.

== Inventors ==
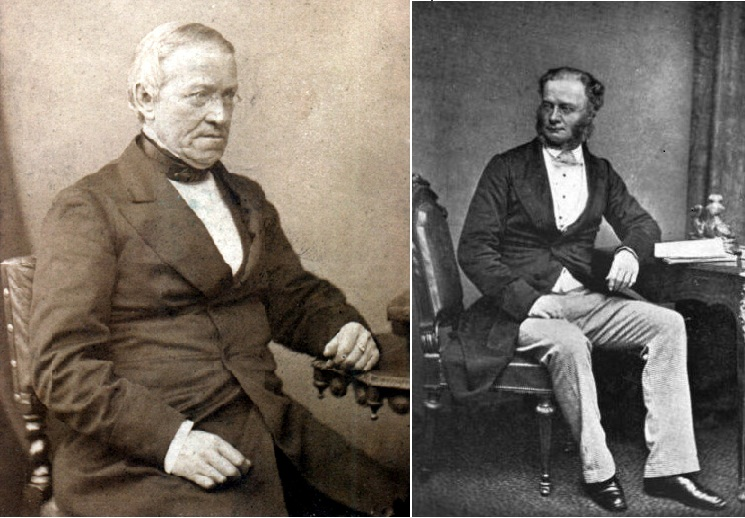
Wheatstone (left) and Cooke (right)

The telegraph arose from a collaboration between William Fothergill Cooke and Charles Wheatstone, best known to schoolchildren from the eponymous Wheatstone bridge. Their collaboration was not a happy one because their objectives differed. Cooke was an inventor and entrepreneur who wished to patent and commercially exploit his inventions. Wheatstone, on the other hand, was an academic with no interest in commercial ventures, and he intended to publish his results and allow others to freely make use of them. This difference in outlook eventually led to a bitter dispute between the two men over claims to priority for the invention. Their differences were taken to arbitration with Marc Isambard Brunel acting for Cooke and John Frederic Daniell acting for Wheatstone. Cooke eventually bought out Wheatstone's interest in exchange for royalties.

Cooke had had some ideas for building a telegraph prior to his partnership with Wheatstone and had consulted scientist Michael Faraday for expert advice. In 1836, Cooke built both an experimental electrometer system and a mechanical telegraph involving a clockwork mechanism with an electromagnetic detent. However, much of the scientific knowledge for the model actually put into practice came from Wheatstone. Cooke's earlier ideas were largely abandoned.

== History ==
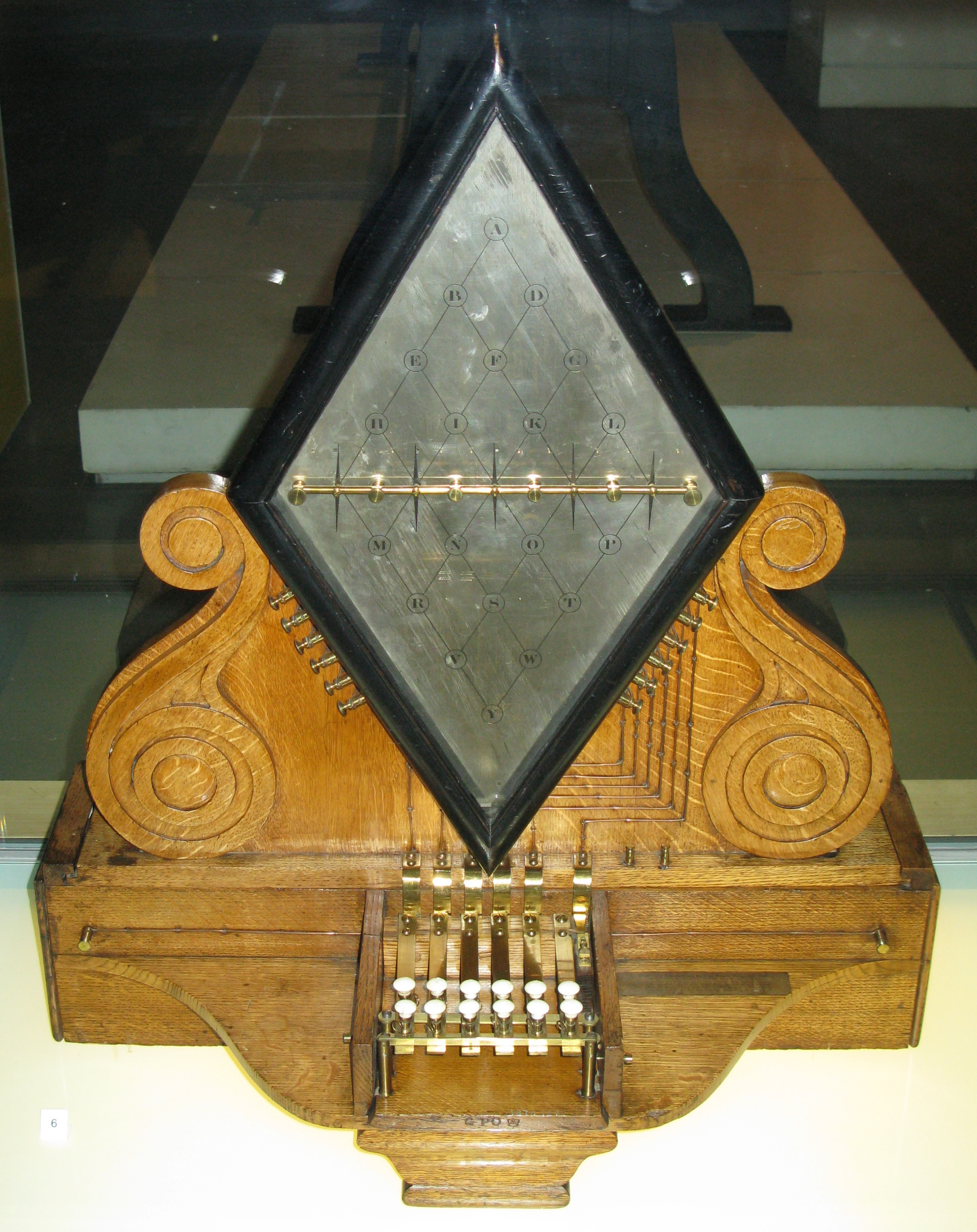
Cooke and Wheatstone's five-needle, six-wire telegraph

In January 1837, Cooke proposed to the directors of the Liverpool and Manchester Railway a design for a 60-code mechanical telegraph. This was too complicated for their purposes; the immediate need was for a simple signal communication between the Liverpool station and a rope-haulage engine house at the top of a steep incline through a long tunnel outside the station. Rope-haulage into main stations was common at this time to avoid noise and pollution, and in this case the gradient was too steep for the locomotive to ascend unaided. All that was required were a few simple signals such as an indication to the engine house to start hauling. Cooke was requested to build a simpler version with fewer codes, which he did by the end of April 1837. However, the railway decided to use instead a pneumatic telegraph equipped with whistles. Soon after this Cooke went into partnership with Wheatstone.

In May 1837 Cooke and Wheatstone patented a telegraph system that used a number of needles on a board that could be moved to point to letters of the alphabet. The patent recommended a five-needle system, but any number of needles could be used depending on the number of characters it was required to code. A four-needle system was installed between Euston and Camden Town in London on a rail line being constructed by Robert Stephenson between London and Birmingham. It was successfully demonstrated on 25 July 1837. This was a similar application to the Liverpool project. The carriages were detached at Camden Town and travelled under gravity into Euston. A system was needed to signal to an engine house at Camden Town to start hauling the carriages back up the incline to the waiting locomotive. As at Liverpool, the electric telegraph was in the end rejected in favour of a pneumatic system with whistles.

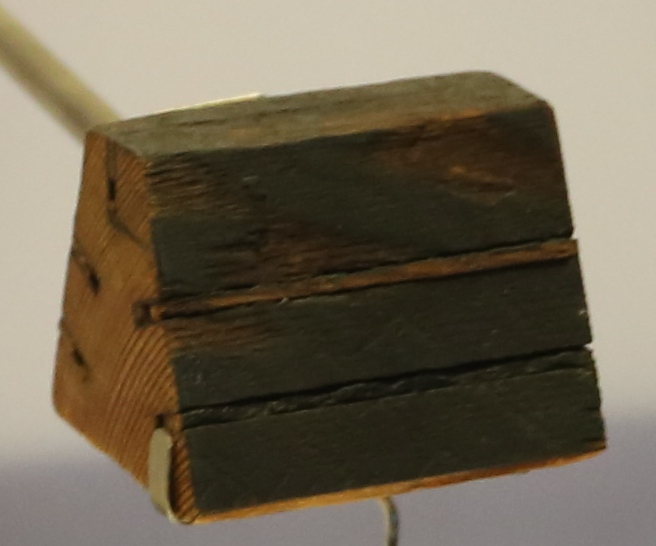
Cooke and Wheatstone 5-wire telegraph cable in a wooden spacer

Cooke and Wheatstone had their first commercial success with a telegraph installed in 1838 on the Great Western Railway over the 13 miles (21 km) from Paddington station to West Drayton. Indeed, this was the first commercial telegraph in the world. This was a five-needle, six-wire system. The cables were originally installed underground in a steel conduit. However, the cables soon began to fail as a result of deteriorating insulation. As an interim measure, a two-needle system was used with three of the remaining working underground wires, which despite using only two needles had a greater number of codes. Since the new code had to be learned, not just read off the display, this was the first time in telegraph history that skilled telegraph operators were required.

When the line was extended to Slough in 1843, a one-needle, two-wire system was installed. Cooke also changed from running the cables in buried lead pipes to the less expensive and easier to maintain system of suspending uninsulated wires on poles from ceramic insulators, a system which he patented, and which rapidly became the most common method. This extension was done at Cooke's own expense, as the railway company was unwilling to finance a system it still considered experimental. Up to this point, the Great Western had insisted on exclusive use and refused Cooke permission to open public telegraph offices. Cooke's new agreement gave the railway free use of the system in exchange for Cooke's right to open public offices, establishing a public telegraph service for the first time. A flat rate was charged (unlike all later telegraph services which charged per word) of one shilling, but many people paid this just to see the strange equipment.

From this point on, the use of the electric telegraph started to grow on the new railways being built from London. The London and Blackwall Railway (another rope-hauled application) was equipped with the Cooke and Wheatstone telegraph when it opened in 1840, and many others followed. The distance involved on the Blackwall Railway (four miles) was too far for steam signalling and the engineer, Robert Stephenson, strongly supported the electric solution. In February 1845, an 88-mile line from Nine Elms to Gosport was completed along the London and South Western Railway, far longer than any other line up to that time. The Admiralty paid half the capital cost and £1,500 per annum for a private two-needle telegraph on this line to connect it to its base in Portsmouth, finally replacing the optical telegraph. In September 1845, the financier John Lewis Ricardo and Cooke formed the Electric Telegraph Company. This company bought out the Cooke and Wheatstone patents and solidly established the telegraph business. In 1869 the company was nationalised and became part of the General Post Office. The one-needle telegraph proved highly successful on British railways, and 15,000 sets were still in use at the end of the nineteenth century. Some remained in service in the 1930s.

The Cooke and Wheatstone telegraph was largely confined to the United Kingdom and the British Empire. However, it was also used in Spain for a time. After nationalisation of the telegraph sector in the UK, the Post Office slowly replaced the diverse systems it had inherited, including the Cooke and Wheatstone telegraph, with the Morse telegraph system.

=== Tawell arrest ===
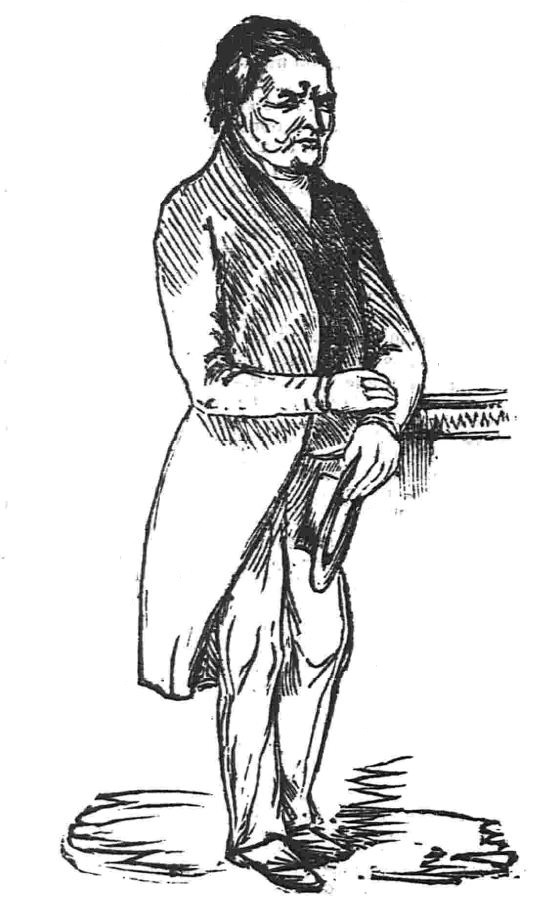
John Tawell at his trial

Murder suspect John Tawell was apprehended following the use of a needle telegraph message from Slough to Paddington on 1 January 1845. This is thought to be the first use of the telegraph to catch a murderer. The message was:

A MURDER HAS GUST BEEN COMMITTED AT SALT HILL AND THE SUSPECTED MURDERER WAS SEEN TO TAKE A FIRST CLASS TICKET TO LONDON BY THE TRAIN WHICH LEFT SLOUGH AT 742 PM HE IS IN THE GARB OF A KWAKER WITH A GREAT COAT ON WHICH REACHES NEARLY DOWN TO HIS FEET HE IS IN THE LAST COMPARTMENT OF THE SECOND CLASS COMPARTMENT

The Cooke and Wheatstone system did not support punctuation, lower case, or some letters. Even the two-needle system omitted the letters J, Q, and Z; hence the misspellings of 'just' and 'Quaker'. This caused some difficulty for the receiving operator at Paddington who repeatedly requested a resend after receiving K-W-A which he assumed was a mistake. This continued until a small boy suggested the sending operator be allowed to complete the word, after which it was understood. After arriving, Tawell was followed to a nearby coffee shop by a detective and arrested there. Newspaper coverage of this incident gave a great deal of publicity to the electric telegraph and brought it firmly into public view.

The widely publicised arrest of Tawell was one of two events which brought the telegraph to greater public attention and led to its widespread use beyond railway signalling. The other event was the announcement by telegraph of the birth of Alfred Ernest Albert, second son of Queen Victoria. The news was published in The Times at the unprecedented speed of 40 minutes after the announcement.

=== Railway block working ===
The signalling block system is a train safety system that divides the track into blocks and uses signals to prevent another train entering a block until a train already in the block has left. The system was proposed by Cooke in 1842 in Telegraphic Railways or the Single Way as a safer way of working on single lines. Previously, separation of trains had relied on strict timetabling only, which was unable to allow for unforeseen events. The first use of block working was probably in 1839 when George Stephenson had a Cooke and Wheatstone telegraph installed in the Clay Cross Tunnel of the North Midland Railway. Instruments specific to block working were installed in 1841. Block working became the norm and remains so to the present day, except that modern technology has allowed fixed blocks to be replaced with moving blocks on the busiest railways.

== Operation ==
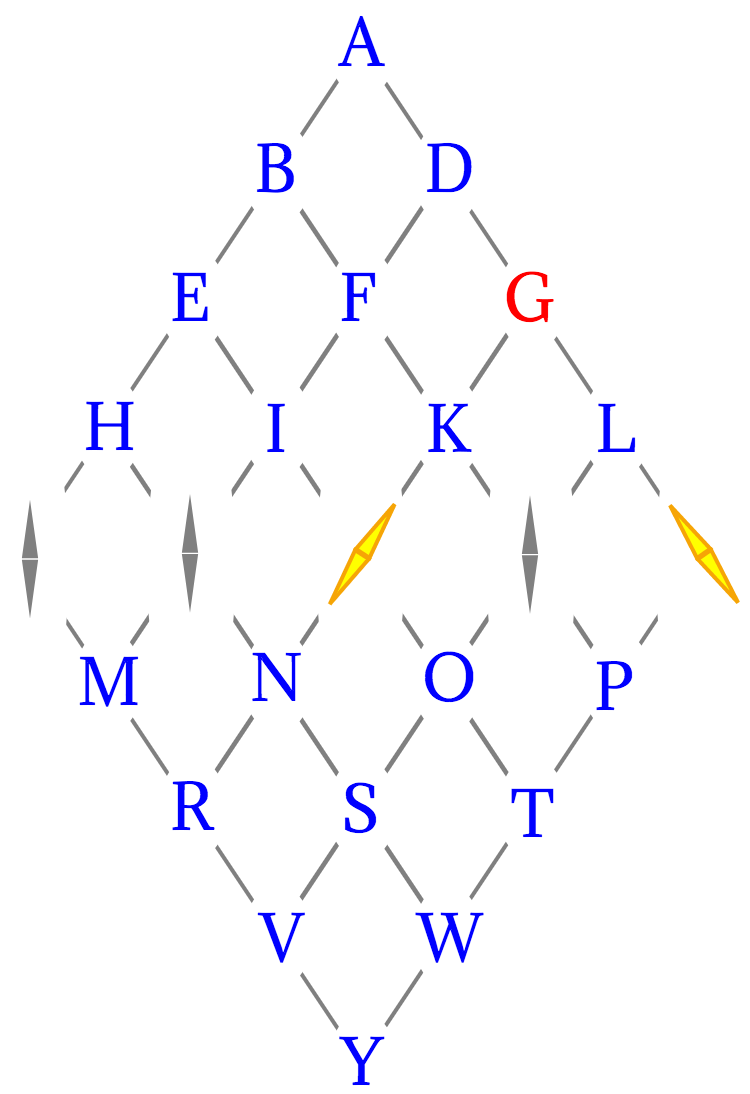
Five-needle telegraph receiving the letter G.

The Cooke and Wheatstone telegraph consisted of a number of magnetic needles which could be made to turn a short distance either clockwise or anti-clockwise by electromagnetic induction from an energising winding. The direction of movement was determined by the direction of the current in the telegraph wires. The board was marked with a diamond shaped grid with a letter at each grid intersection, and so arranged that when two needles were energised they would point to a specific letter.

The number of wires required by the Cooke and Wheatstone system is equal to the number of needles used. Cooke and Wheatstone's patent recommends five needles, and this was the number on their early demonstration models. The number of symbols that can be obtained using a code similar to the one the five needle system used depends on the number of needles available; generalizing, with a number $x$ of needles it is possible to encode $f(x)=x(x-1)$ symbols. So:

Number of needles	Possible symbols
$2$	$2$
$3$	$6$
$4$	$12$
$5$	$20$
$6$	$30$
$7$	$42$
$8$	$56$
$9$	$72$
$10$	$90$

At the sending end there were two rows of buttons, a pair of buttons for each coil in each row. The operator selected one button from each row. This connected two of the coils to the positive and negative ends of the battery respectively. The other ends of the coils were connected to the telegraph wires and thence to one end of the coils at the receiving station. The other ends of the receiving coils, while in receive mode, were all commoned together. Thus the current flowed through the same two coils at both ends and energised the same two needles. With this system the needles were always energised in pairs and always rotated in opposite directions.

=== Five-needle telegraph ===
The five-needle telegraph with twenty possible needle positions was six codes short of being able to encode the complete alphabet. The letters omitted were C, J, Q, U, X and Z. A great selling point of this telegraph was that it was simple to use and required little operator training. There is no code to learn, as the letter being sent was visibly displayed to both the sending and receiving operator.

At some point, the ability to move a single needle independently was added. This required an additional conductor for a common return, possibly by means of an earth return. This dramatically increased the codespace available, but using arbitrary codes would have required more extensive operator training since the display could not be read on sight from the grid as the simple alphabetic codes were. Because of this, the additional functionality was only used to add numerals by pointing a needle to the numeral required marked around the edge of the board. The economic need to reduce the number of wires in the end proved a stronger incentive than simplicity of use and led Cooke and Wheatstone to develop the two-needle and one-needle telegraphs.

Circuit diagram of the five-needle telegraph transmitting the character A

=== Two-needle telegraph ===
The two-needle telegraph required three wires, one for each needle and a common return. The coding was somewhat different from the five-needle telegraph and needed to be learned, rather than read from a display. The needles could move to the left or right either one, two, or three times in quick succession, or a single time in both directions in quick succession. Either needle, or both together, could be moved. This gave a total of 24 codes, one of which was taken up by the stop code. Thus, three letters were omitted: J, Q and Z, which were substituted with G, K and S respectively.

Originally, the telegraph was fitted with a bell that rang when another operator wanted attention. This proved so annoying that it was removed. It was found that the clicking of the needle against its endstop was sufficient to draw attention.

=== One-needle telegraph ===
This system was developed to replace the failing multi-wire telegraph on the Paddington to West Drayton line. It required only two wires but a more complex code and slower transmission speed. Whereas the two-needle system needed a three-unit code (that is, up to three movements of the needles to represent each letter), the one-needle system used a four-unit code but had enough codes to encode the entire alphabet. Like the preceding two-needle system, the code units consisted of rapid deflections of the needle to either left or right in quick succession. The needle struck a post when it moved, causing it to ring. Different tones were provided for the left and right movements so that the operator could hear the needle's direction without looking at it.

== Codes ==
Original codes for the one-, two-, and five-needle telegraphs. (Note: Shaffner (page 221) has the 1-needle codes for K and L swapped to those shown in the table. This appears to be an error. Both Huurdeman (page 68) and Guillemin (page 551) give these codes as per table, as do examples of surviving instruments. Also, the glyphs are marked on the face of the instrument with those on the right being the mirror image of the corresponding glyph on the left. Shaffner's arrangement breaks this mirror symmetry.) A stroke leaning to the left indicates a needle rotated anti-clockwise, that is, with the top pointing to the left. A stroke leaning to the right indicates a needle pointing to the right. For multiple stroke codes, the first movement is in the direction of the short stroke. For example, in the one-needle code, E is left-right-left, L is right-left-right-left, and U is left-left-right. (Note: Huurdeman (page 68) reads the glyph strokes in strict left-to-right order regardless of stroke length. This cannot be correct since it leads to ambiguous codes—for instance E and U would be identically left-left-right. Also, the mirror symmetry of the glyph markings suggests that the codes on the right (that is, from M onwards) should be read right-to-left, not left-to-right (but still observing short stroke first). Shaffner, who was alive when this telegraph was still in operation and observed it in use in England, is the source (page 221) for the principle of executing the short stroke first. Guillemin does not state the principle explicitly, but it can be inferred since he gives another code in both tick-mark glyphs and numbers.)

The codes were refined and adapted as they were used. By 1867 numerals had been added to the five-needle code. This was achieved through the provision of a sixth wire for common return making it possible to move just a single needle. With the original five wires it was only possible to move the needles in pairs and always in opposite directions since there was no common wire provided. Many more codes are theoretically possible with common return signalling, but not all of them can conveniently be used with a grid indication display. The numerals were worked in by marking them around the edge of the diamond grid. Needles 1 through 5 when energised to the right pointed to numerals 1 through 5 respectively, and to the left numerals 6 through 9 and 0 respectively. Two additional buttons were provided on the telegraph sets to enable the common return to be connected to either the positive or negative terminal of the battery according to the direction it was desired to move the needle.

Also by 1867, codes for Q and Z (Note: Shaffner does not give a clear explanation of how the glyphs and should be read. He says that "each of these letters are composed of two deflections each way" (pages 221–222), which suggests that they are equivalent to and respectively, and not a different code.) were added to the one-needle code, but not, apparently, for J. However, codes for Q, Z, and J are marked on the plates of later needle telegraphs, together with six-unit codes for number shift and letter shift. Numerous compound codes were added for operator controls such as wait and repeat. These compounds are similar to the prosigns found in Morse code where the two characters are run together without a character gap. The two-needle number shift and letter shift codes are also compounds, which is the reason they have been written with an overbar.

== General and cited references ==
- Beauchamp, Ken, History of Telegraphy, IET, 2001 ISBN 0852967926.
- Bowers, Brian, Sir Charles Wheatstone: 1802–1875, IET, 2001 ISBN 0852961030.
- Bowler, Peter J.; Morus, Iwan Rhys, Making Modern Science: A Historical Survey, University of Chicago Press, 2010 ISBN 0226068625.
- Burns, Russel W., Communications: An International History of the Formative Years, IEE, 2004 ISBN 0863413277.
- Cooke, William F., Telegraphic Railways or the Single Way, Simpkin, Marshall & Company, 1842 OCLC 213732219.
- Duffy, Michael C., Electric Railways: 1880-1990, IEE, 2003, ISBN 9780852968055.
- Guillemin, Amédée, The Applications of Physical Forces, Macmillan and Company, 1877 OCLC 5894380237.
- Huurdeman, Anton A., The Worldwide History of Telecommunications, John Wiley & Sons, 2003 ISBN 0471205052.
- Kieve, Jeffrey L., The Electric Telegraph: A Social and Economic History, David and Charles, 1973 OCLC 655205099.
- Mercer, David, The Telephone: The Life Story of a Technology, Greenwood Publishing Group, 2006 ISBN 031333207X.
- Shaffner, Taliaferro Preston, The Telegraph Manual, Pudney & Russell, 1859.
