= Altdöbern =

- Municipality
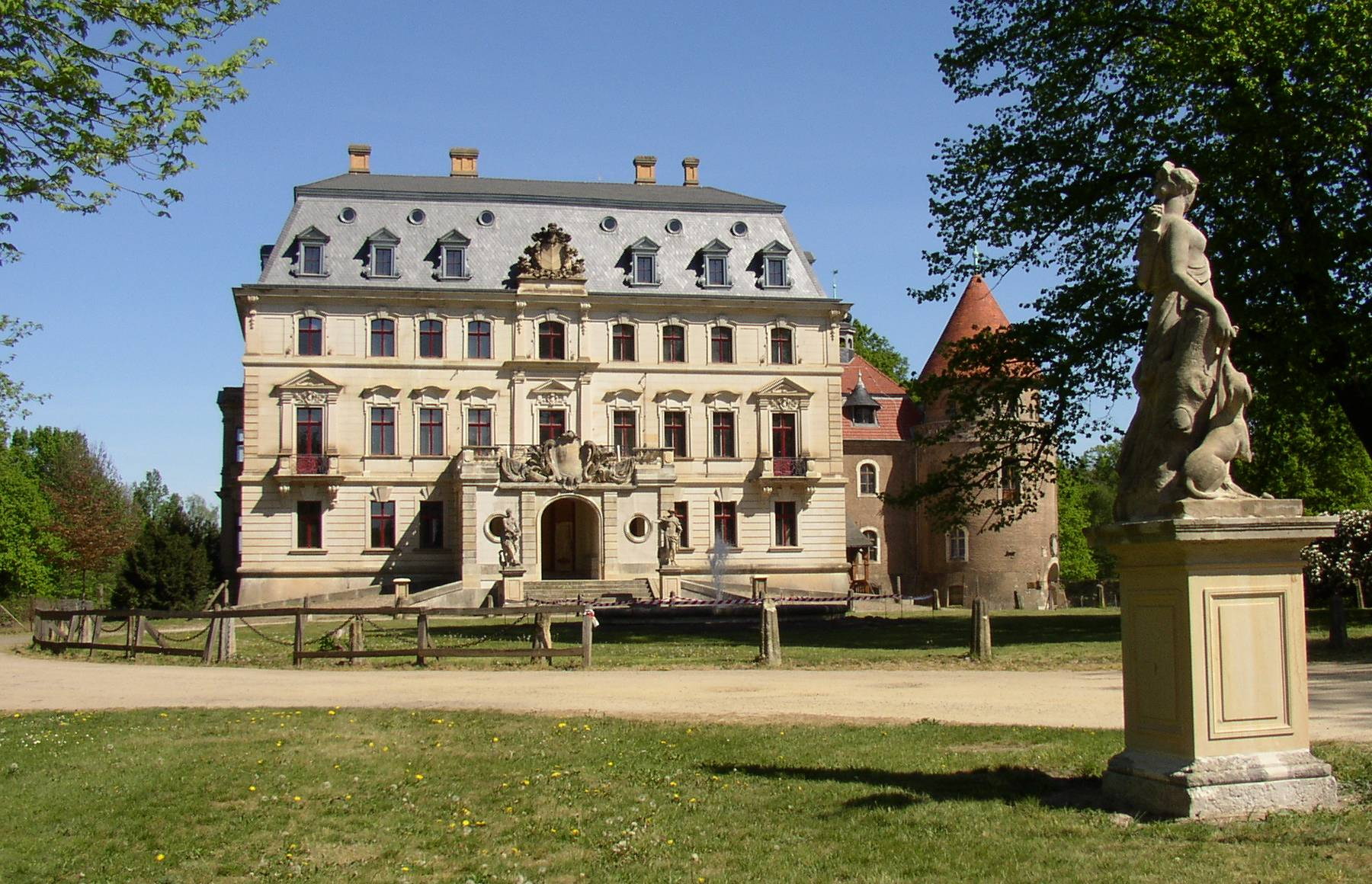
- Castle

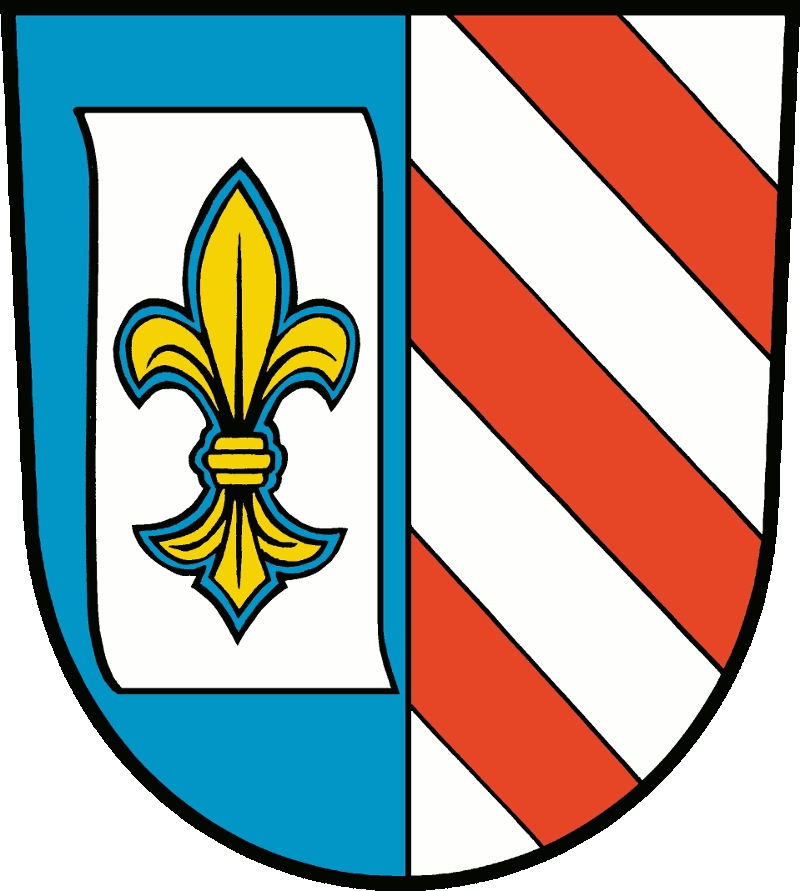
- Coat of arms

- Location of Altdöbern within Oberspreewald-Lausitz district
- Interactive map of Altdöbern
- Location within Germany Location within Brandenburg
- Coordinates: 51°39′N 14°02′E
- Country: Germany
- State: Brandenburg
- District: Oberspreewald-Lausitz
- Municipal assoc.: Altdöbern
- Subdivisions: 3 Ortsteile

Government
  - Mayor (2024–29): Peter Winzer (SPD)

Area
  - Total: 61.54 km^{2} (23.76 sq mi)
- Elevation: 87 m (285 ft)

Population (2025-12-31)
  - Total: 2,286
  - Density: 37.15/km^{2} (96.21/sq mi)
- Time zone: UTC+01:00 (CET)
  - Summer (DST): UTC+02:00 (CEST)
- Postal codes: 03229
- Dialling codes: 035434
- Vehicle registration: OSL
- Website: www.altdoebern.de

Altdöbern (German pronunciation: [ˈaltˌdøːbɐn], lit. 'Old Döbern', in contrast to "New Döbern"; Lower Sorbian: Stara Darbnja) is a municipality in the Oberspreewald-Lausitz district, in southern Brandenburg, Germany.

== Geography ==
Altdöbern lies in Lower Lusatia, but is not part of its sorbian inhabited area. The flat landscape is dominated by large forests and new lakes created from the remainings of former opencast lignite mines since the 1990s. One of these is 880 ha (2200 acre) large Altdöberner See, east of the town. Its flooding is planned to be finished in the 2020s.

The municipality of Altdöbern also contains the settlements Pritzen, Peitzendorf and Chransdorf and the villages Ranzow and Reddern.

The municipalities of Altdöbern, Bronkow, Luckaitztal, Neupetershain (Nowe Wiki) and Neu-Seeland together form the collective municipality Amt Altdöbern.

== Culture and architecture ==
The baroque castle of Altdöbern (Schloss Altdöbern) with its surrounding park (Schlosspark) is just northwest of the central market square (Markt). The first castle was built in the 16th century in renaissance style, but later replaced by a new building in baroque architecture including rococo elements. Intense restorations are still in progress, but the interior of the castle can be visited during special events such as the annual park festival (Parksommerträume). The landscape park also contains a small French garden and the large Salzteich lake.

The Protestant church at the market square was built only in 1918–1921, after the medieval predecessor burned in 1914. Other Protestant churches exist in Pritzen and Reddern. A minor catholic church exists at the Waldstraße in Altdöbern.

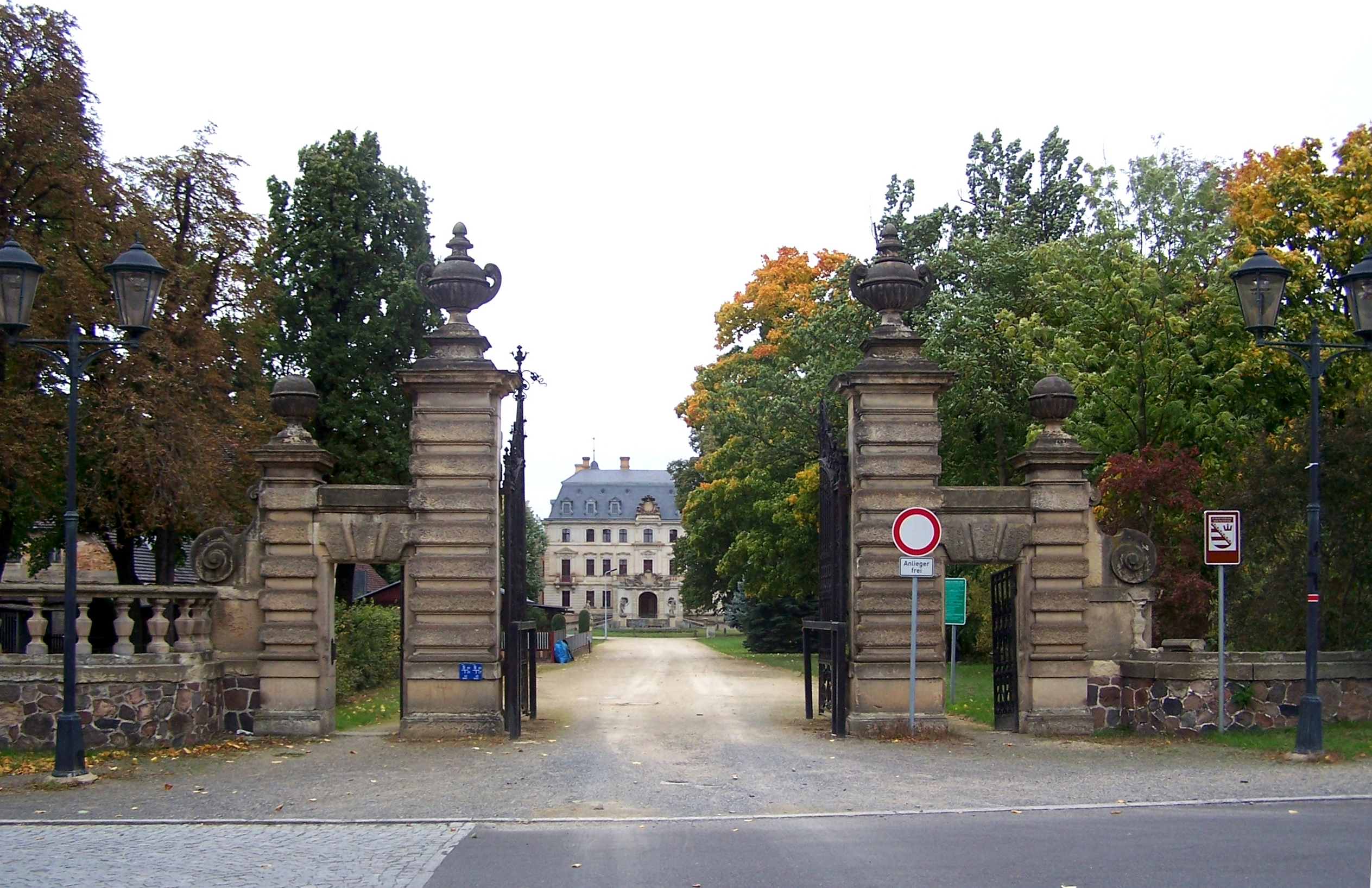
Portal to castle and park

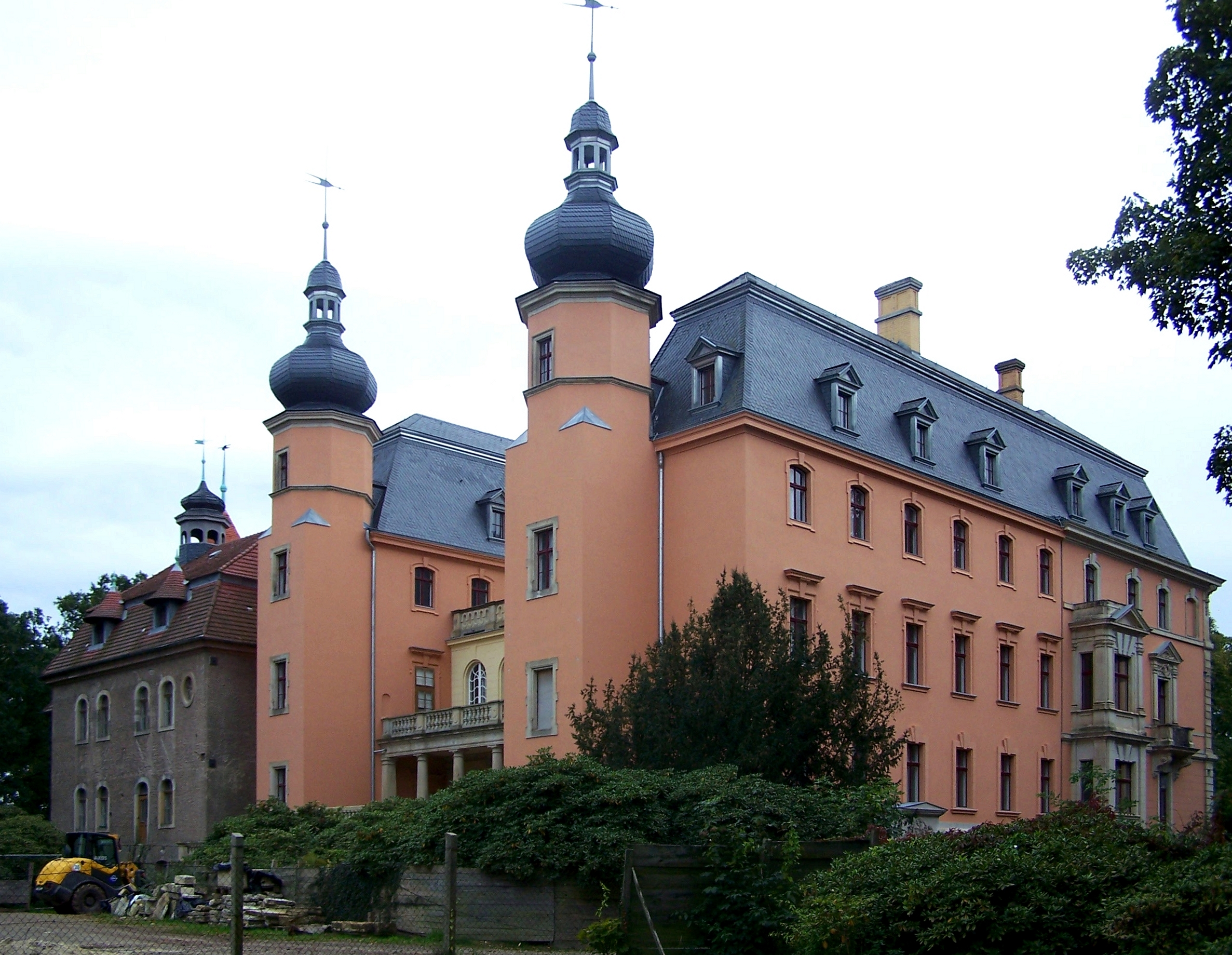
Rear view of Altdöbern Castle

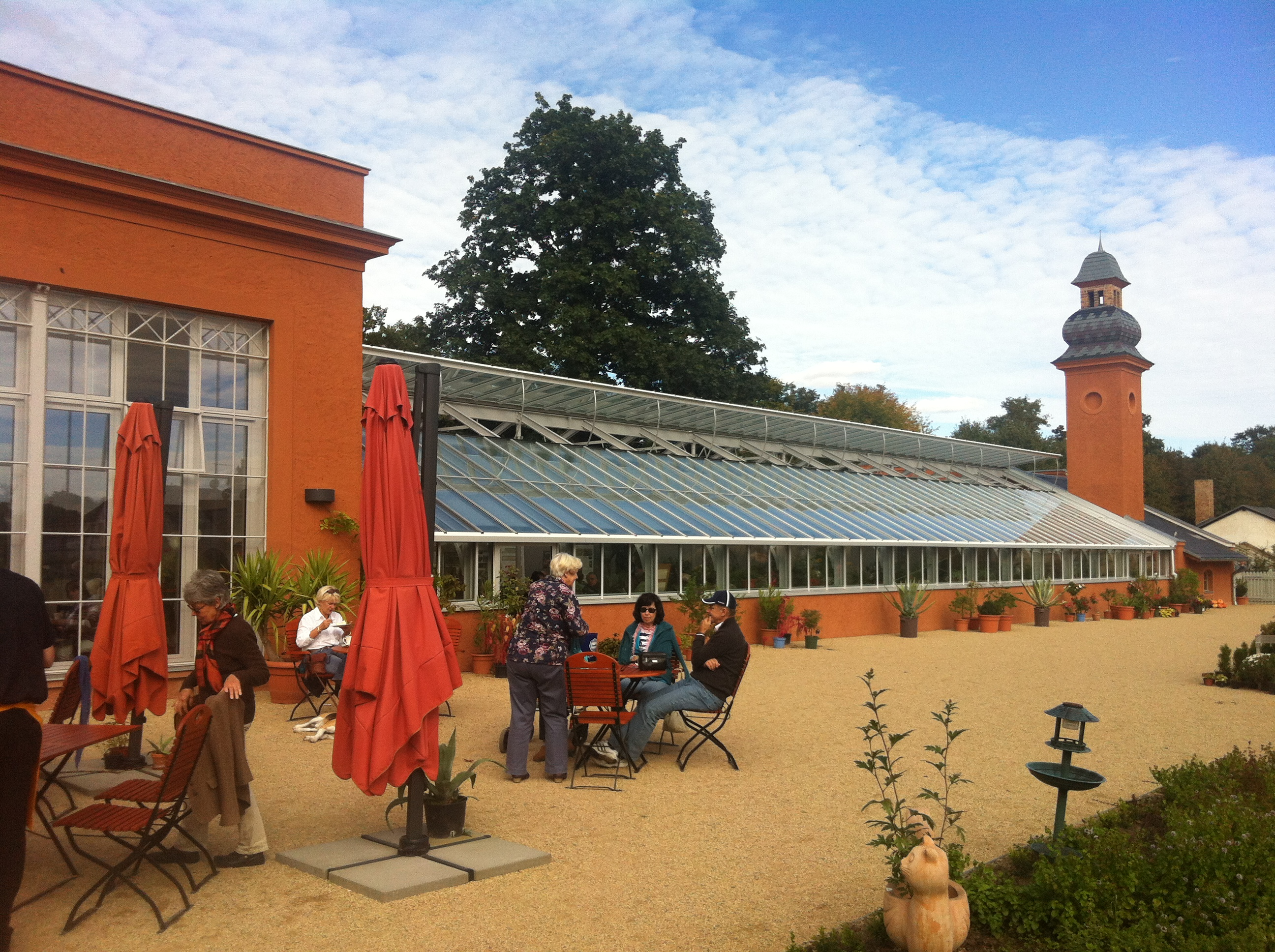
The former orangerie today hosts a café

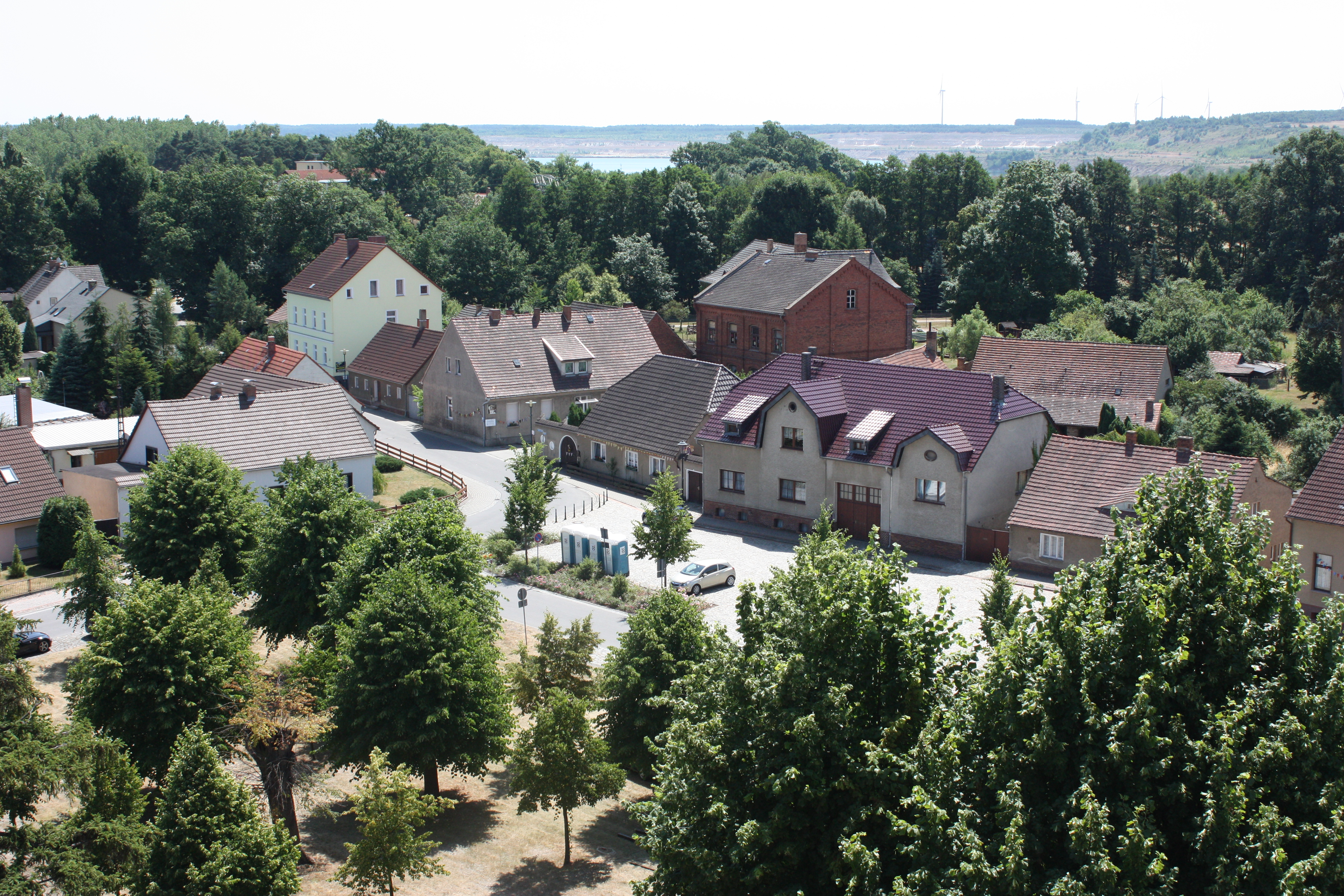
Houses at the market square and the lake in the background

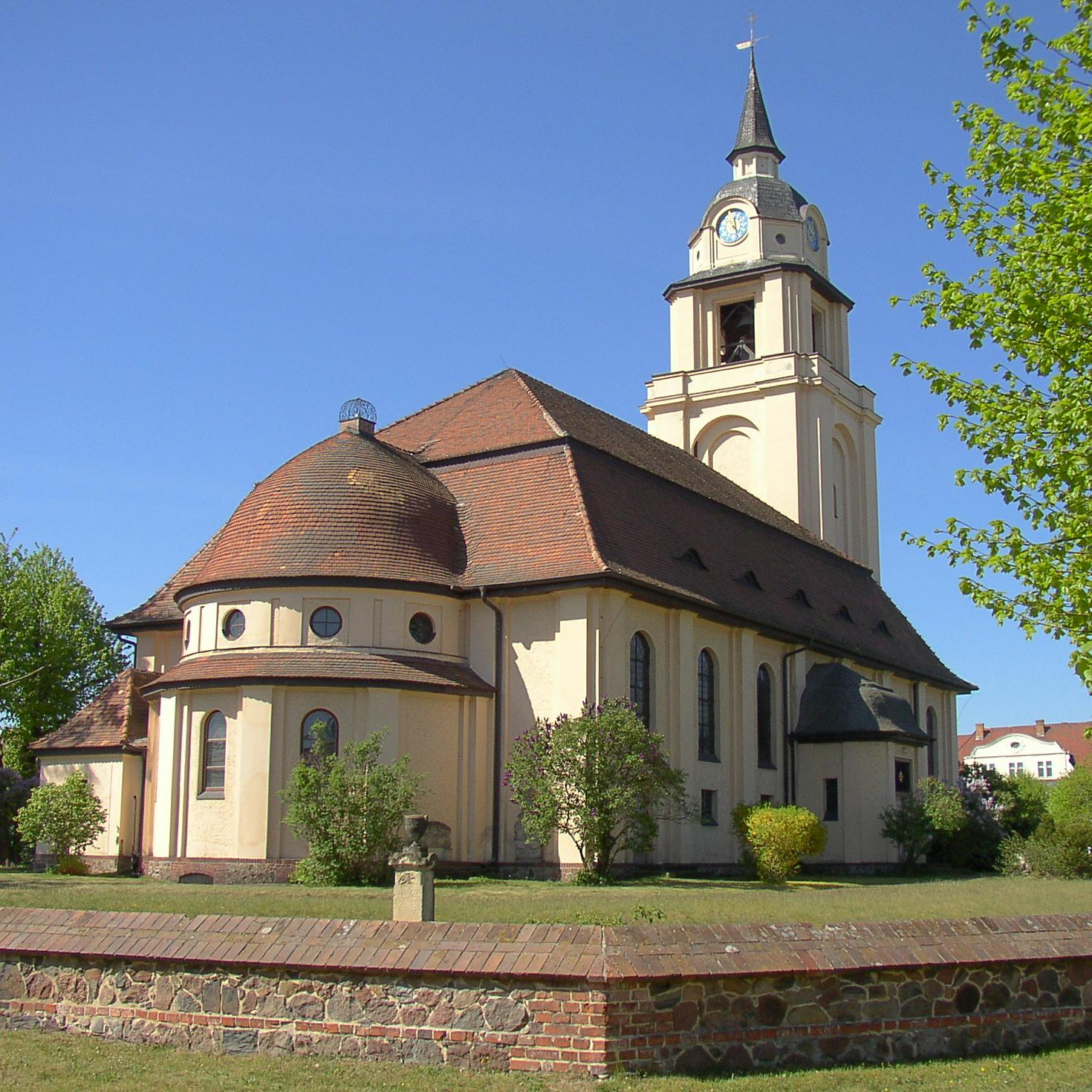
Protestant church

== Transport ==
Via the state road L 53 Altdöbern is connected with Großräschen (B 96) to the south and Calau to the north. Next Autobahn junctions are Freienhufen and Bronkow at A 13 (Berlin–Dresden) and Cottbus-West at A 15 (Berlin–Forst).

Railway stop Haltepunkt Altdöbern gives regional connections to Berlin, Cottbus and Dresden (via Senftenberg).

== History ==
From 1815 to 1945, Altdöbern was part of the Prussian Province of Brandenburg.

From 1952 to 1990, it was part of the Bezirk Cottbus of East Germany.

== Demography ==
Development of Population since 1875 within the Current Boundaries (Blue Line: Population; Dotted Line: Comparison to Population Development of Brandenburg state; Grey Background: Time of Nazi rule; Red Background: Time of Communist rule)

Altdöbern: Population development
within the current boundaries (2013)

Year	Pop.	±% p.a.
1875	2,150	—
1890	2,531	+1.09%
1910	3,035	+0.91%
1925	2,845	−0.43%
1933	2,988	+0.61%
1939	2,886	−0.58%
1946	3,651	+3.42%
1950	3,797	+0.99%
1964	4,694	+1.53%
1971	4,329	−1.15%
1981	3,751	−1.42%
1985	3,710	−0.27%
1989	3,579	−0.89%
1990	3,548	−0.87%
1991	3,457	−2.56%
1992	3,658	+5.81%
1993	3,771	+3.09%
1994	3,741	−0.80%
1995	3,415	−8.71%
1996	3,418	+0.09%
1997	3,430	+0.35%

Year	Pop.	±% p.a.
1998	3,403	−0.79%
1999	3,367	−1.06%
2000	3,292	−2.23%
2001	3,175	−3.55%
2002	3,148	−0.85%
2003	3,108	−1.27%
2004	3,029	−2.54%
2005	2,977	−1.72%
2006	2,923	−1.81%
2007	2,854	−2.36%
2008	2,835	−0.67%
2009	2,770	−2.29%
2010	2,694	−2.74%
2011	2,660	−1.26%
2012	2,605	−2.07%
2013	2,550	−2.11%
2014	2,531	−0.75%
2015	2,527	−0.16%
2016	2,518	−0.36%
2020	2,385	−1.35%
