= Saadow =

Saadow Žadow
- District
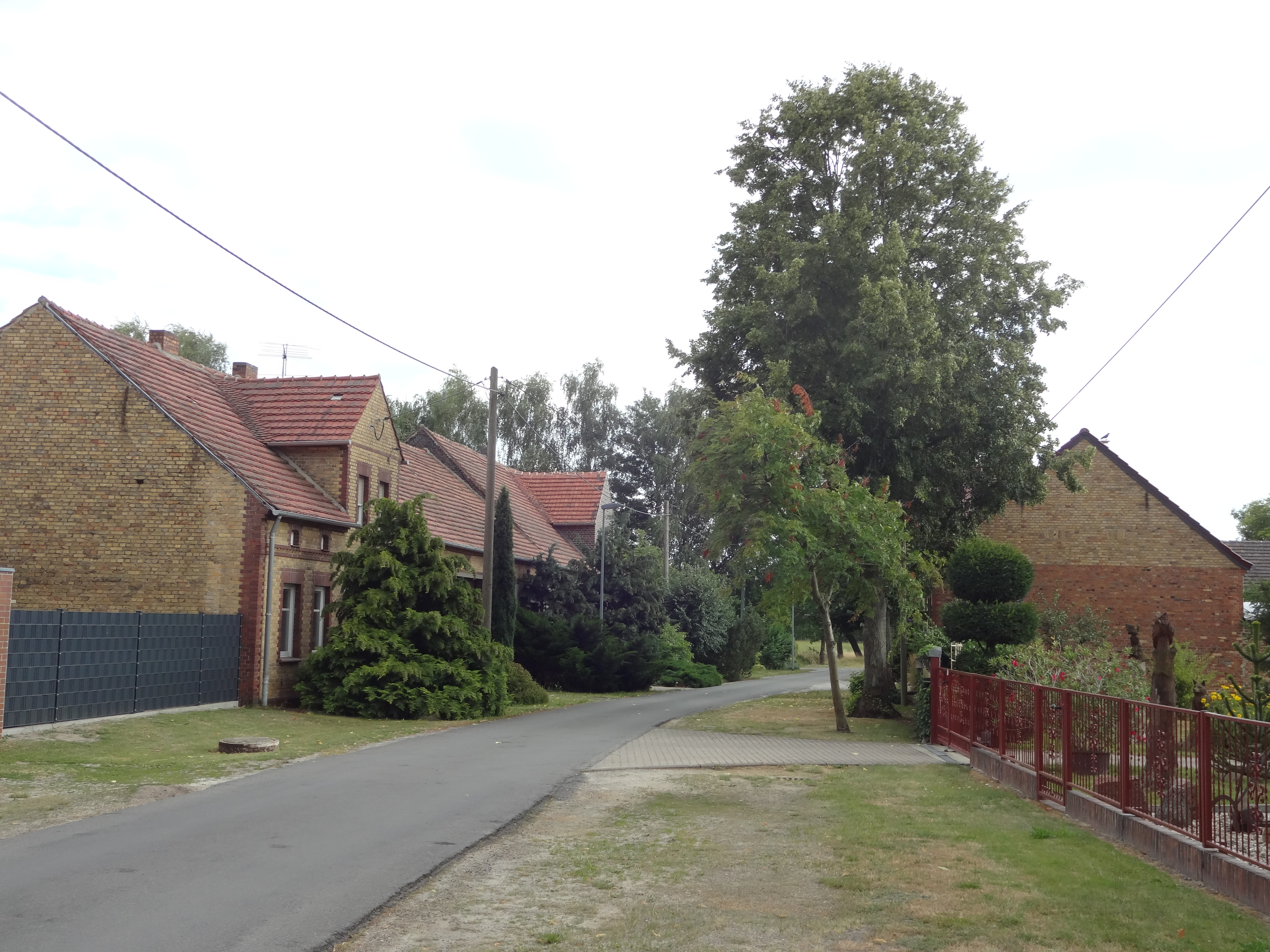
- Street in Saadow
- Interactive map of Saadow; Žadow
- Country: Germany
- State: Brandenburg
- Municipality: Bronkow
- Elevation: 121 m (397 ft)

Population (2006-12-31)
  - Total: 132
- Postal code: 03205
- Area code: 035435

Saadow (Also Saado, both pronounced [ˈzaːdo]; Lower Sorbian: Žadow, pronounced [ˈʒadɔw]) is a part of the municipality of Bronkow in the Amt Altdöbern. The village is located in the western part of the South Brandenburg district of Oberspreewald-Lausitz.

== Geography ==
Saadow is located in Lower Lusatia, south of the Niederlausitzer Landrücken Nature Park and north of the Lusatian border wall.

To the northwest is the municipal district of Rutzkau, followed by Amandusdorf and the village of Bronkow to the north and northeast. To the east are villages of the municipality of Luckaitztal and to the southeast is Lipten, with further to the south being Wormlage, Barzig, and Saalhausen, districts of the town of Großräschen. To the west, Saadow borders Göllnitz and Lindthal, which are already located in the neighboring district of Elbe-Elster.

== History ==
Saadow consisted of a village and a corresponding manor. Ernst Eichler assumes that the place name can be traced back to the Sorbian personal name Žad. Another interpretation derives the name from the Sorbian word sad for fruit. The village was first mentioned in 1473 as Saydo, in 1495 it was called Saida, and in 1527 Schadaw. The place name was mentioned in 1732 as Sado and in 1761 as Sade. The Sorbian name variants followed in 1761 with Żadow and Žadow. Owners of the place were from 1460 to 1526 the lords of Köckritz zu Seese. Other owners were from the Minckwitz. In 1598, Elias von Loeben acquired the estates Bronkow, Lug and Saadow from Christoph von Minckwitz.

Following the Congress of Vienna, Saadow and the entire Lower Lusatia region came to the Kingdom of Prussia and belonged to the Calau district. In 1928, Saadow village and manor were combined. After World War II, Saadow became part of the newly founded Calau district in 1952 and was incorporated into Bronkow on July 1, 1965. On October 26, 2003, the municipalities of Lug, Lipten, and Bronkow, with its districts Saadow and Rutzkau, merged into the municipality of Bronkow. Saadow is incorporated to the parish of Göllnitz.

== Landmarks ==
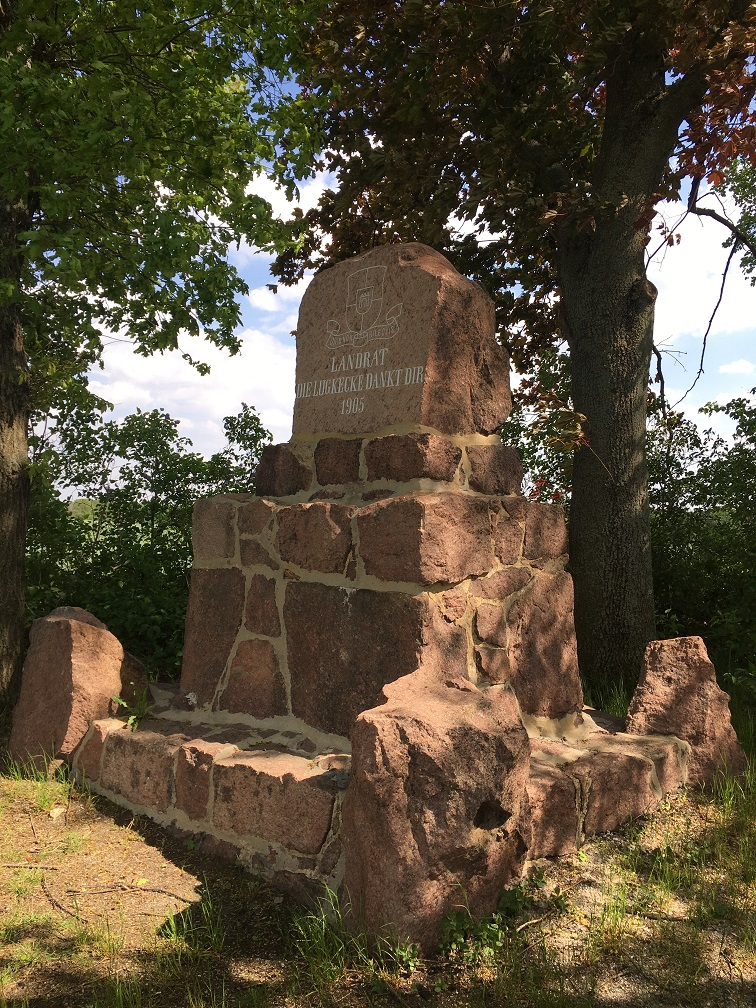
County Commissioner Monument near Saadow

The County Commissioner Monument, restored in the spring of 2022, is located on Liptener Strasse, east of the village. It bears the inscription "COUNTY COMMISSIONER, THE LUGKECKE THANKS YOU 1905." and above it the family coat of arms with the Latin saying "QUID NON DILECTIS" (English: "What don't we do for the ones we love"). The monument refers to the County Commissioner of the Calau district from 1900 to 1919, Count Karl Alphons von Pourtalès (1861–1930), from Laasow (Vetschau/Spreewald). The monument was erected due to the commissioner's commitment in the region once shaped by the large Lug lake.
