= Lichtenau =

Lichtenau may refer to:

In Germany:

- Towns and municipalities:
  - Hessisch Lichtenau
  - Lichtenau, Baden-Württemberg
  - Lichtenau, Bavaria
  - Lichtenau, Saxony
  - Lichtenau, Westphalia
- Villages
  - Lichtenau, Lübbenau
- Rivers
  - Lichtenau (river), Thuringia

In Austria:

- Towns and municipalities:
  - Lichtenau im Mühlkreis
  - Lichtenau im Waldviertel

In Greenland:

- Alluitsoq, a former settlement previously known as Lichtenau

In Czech Republic:

- Lichkov, German name Lichtenau, a village

In the United States:

- Lichtenau, Ohio, a ghost town

== People with that name ==
- Konrad of Lichtenau (died 1240), medieval German chronicler from Swabia
- Heinrich von Lichtenau (1444–1517), Prince-Bishop of Augsburg
- Wilhelmine, Gräfin von Lichtenau (1753–1820 in Berlin), official mistress of King Frederick William II of Prussia
