= Sebastian Schuppan =

German footballer

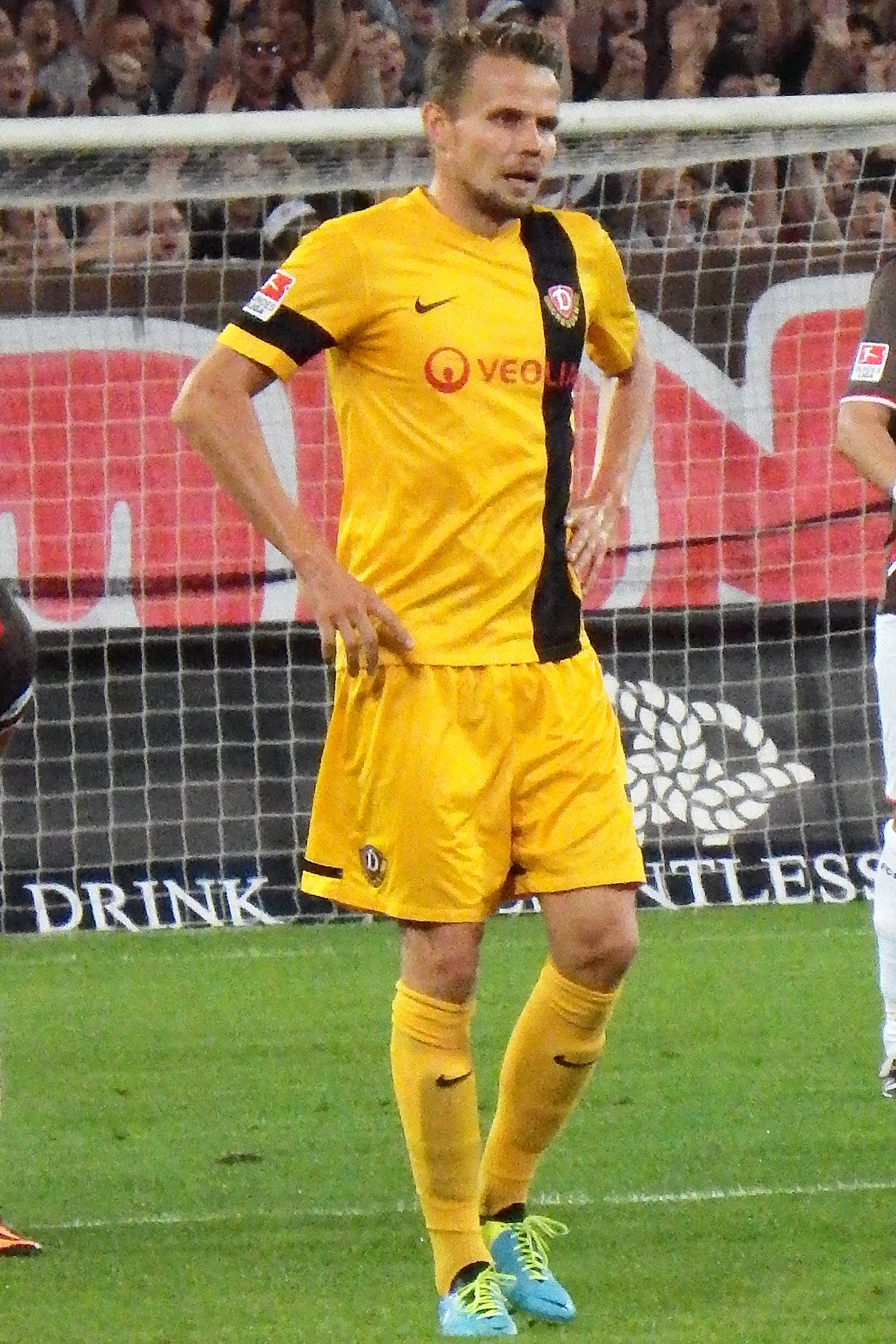
- Schuppan playing for Dresden in 2013

Personal information
- Date of birth: 18 July 1986 (age 40)
- Place of birth: Lauchhammer, East Germany
- Height: 1.87 m (6 ft 2 in)
- Position: Midfielder

Team information
- Current team: RB Leipzig (sporting director)

Youth career
- 1992–2002: Glückauf Brieske-Senftenberg
- 2002–2004: Energie Cottbus

Senior career*
Years	Team	Apps	(Gls)
2004–2008	Energie Cottbus II	66	(20)
2004–2008	Energie Cottbus	27	(0)
2008–2010	SC Paderborn	14	(0)
2010–2014	Dynamo Dresden	106	(8)
2014–2017	Arminia Bielefeld	92	(8)
2017–2020	Würzburger Kickers	104	(13)
Total		409	(49)

Managerial career
- 2021: Würzburger Kickers
- * Club domestic league appearances and goals

Sebastian Schuppan (born 18 July 1986) is a German former professional footballer who played as a midfielder. He currently serves as the sporting director of Bundesliga club RB Leipzig.

== Playing career ==
Schuppan grew up in Hohenbocka, Oberspreewald-Lausitz. He started his football career at the age of six with FSV Glückauf Brieske-Senftenberg and at the age of 15 moved to the youth academy of the local professional club, Energie Cottbus. There, he progressed through the youth system before making his first-team debut in the 2. Bundesliga in the 2004–05 season. Playing as a left midfielder, Schuppan was part of the team that reached promotion to the Bundesliga the following year.

Schuppan, who had a contract with Energie Cottbus until 2008, failed to gain fitness at the start of the Bundesliga season after suffering an injury and thus only played for the second team in the Regionalliga in the 2007–08 season. He then left the club and joined newly relegated SC Paderborn in the 3. Liga, with whom he achieved promotion back into the 2. Bundesliga in his first season. After the end of the 2009–10 season, his contract in Paderborn was not extended. Schuppan then signed for Dynamo Dresden of the 3. Liga ahead of the 2010–11 season, and also achieved promotion to the 2. Bundesliga with them.

After relegation from the second division in 2014, Schuppan moved to Arminia Bielefeld in the third division. With the Bielefeld team, he won promotion to the 2. Bundesliga in his first season, the third time this happened in his career. His contract, which ended in 2017, was not renewed. Schuppan then joined Würzburger Kickers, with whom he signed a contract until 2019. For the 2018–19 season, Schuppan also became team captain of the Würzburg team and he extended his contract in January 2019 to 30 June 2020 – with the option of an additional season. With the Kickers, he achieved his fourth promotion to the 2. Bundesliga with a fourth club in the 2019–20 season. By scoring a goal on a penalty kick in stoppage time to equalise 2–2 against Hallescher FC on the last day of the season, he ultimately won promotion for his club.

After leading Würzburger Kickers to the 2. Bundesliga, Schuppan announced his decision to retire from football.

== Executive career ==
On 17 November 2020, Schuppan took over the newly created position of sporting director at the Würzburger Kickers, reporting directly to chairman of the board, Daniel Sauer. He was announced as the new head coach of Würzburg on 2 April 2021 for the remainder of the season.

== Honours ==
Energie Cottbus

- 2. Bundesliga promotion: 2005–06

SC Paderborn

- 3. Liga play-offs: 2009

Dynamo Dresden

- 3. Liga play-offs: 2011

Arminia Bielefeld

- 3. Liga: 2014–15

Würzburger Kickers

- 3. Liga runners-up: 2019–20
- Bavarian Cup: 2018–19
