= Bischdorf, Lübbenau =

Bischdorf/Wótšowc
- Ortsteil of Lübbenau
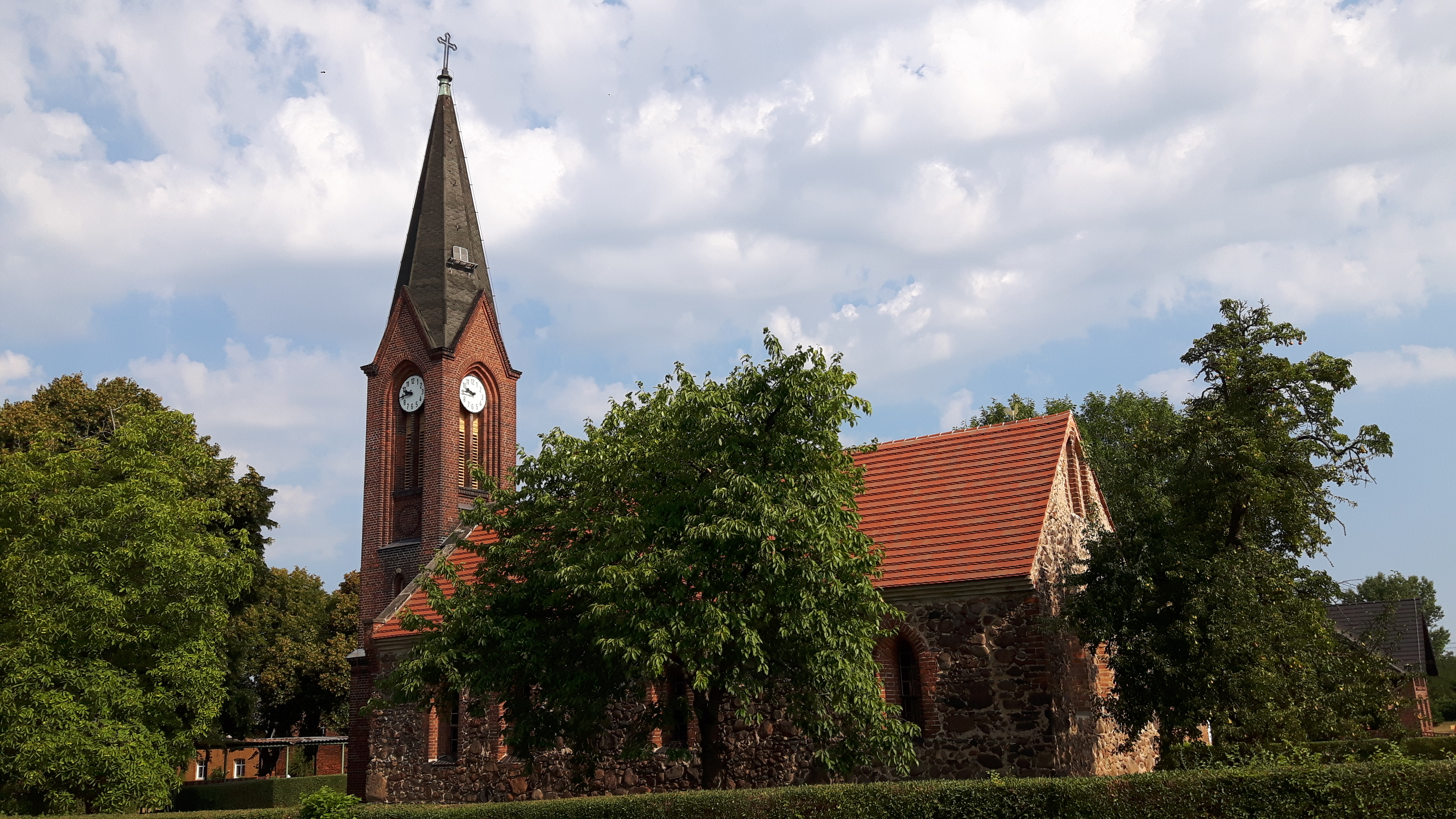
- Local lutheran church
- Interactive map of Bischdorf/Wótšowc
- Location within Germany Location within Brandenburg
- Coordinates: 51°47′38″N 13°58′18″E
- Country: Germany
- State: Brandenburg
- District: Oberspreewald-Lausitz
- Town: Lübbenau

Area
  - Total: 16.94 km^{2} (6.54 sq mi)
- Elevation: 77 m (253 ft)

Population (2021)
  - Total: 211
  - Density: 12.5/km^{2} (32.3/sq mi)
- Time zone: UTC+01:00 (CET)
  - Summer (DST): UTC+02:00 (CEST)
- Postal codes: 03222
- Dialling codes: 03541
- Vehicle registration: OSL, CA, SFB

Bischdorf (Lower Sorbian: Wótšowc) is a village and former municipality in the Oberspreewald-Lausitz district of Brandenburg, Germany. It is located in Lusatia about 90 km (55 mi) south of Berlin. Since 26 October 2003, Bischdorf is part of the town Lübbenau.

== History ==
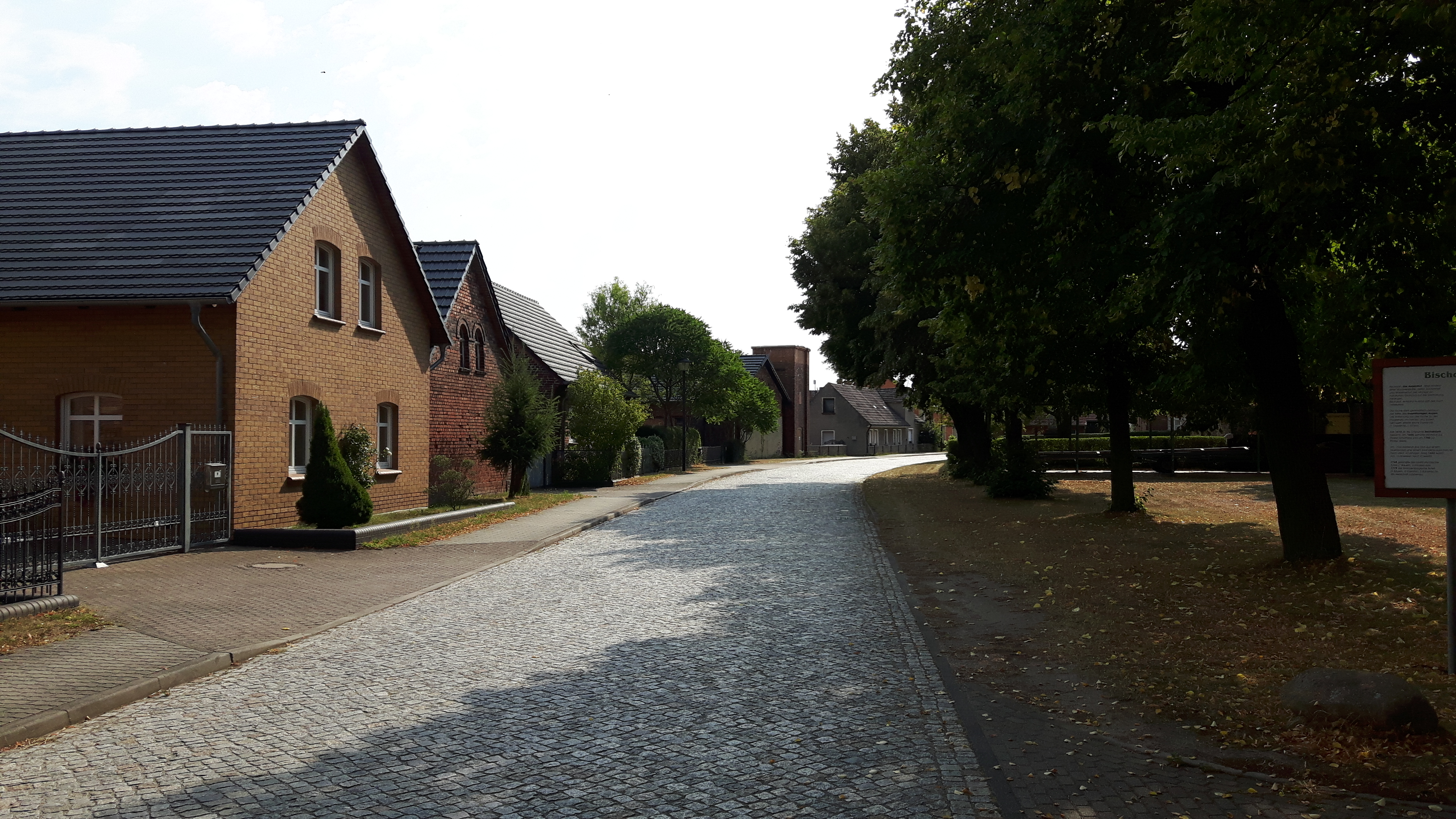
Inside the village center

Bischdorf was founded around the year 1200 as a so called Angerdorf and first mentioned in 1415. The German name Bischdorf derived from the Bishopric of Meissen, by which the village was owned at the time. The Lower Sorbian name Wótšowc can be translated as small island. After Bischdorf was destroyed during the Thirty Years' War, it was rebuilt and resettled in 1652. During the 17th and 18th century, Bischdorf was divided into two parts, one of which belonged to Margraviate of Brandenburg, while the other part of Bischdorf was claimed by the Electorate of Saxony. In 1815, the entire village became part of the Prussian Province of Brandenburg. After the construction of the Lübbenau–Kamenz railway in 1874, Bischdorf got a freight depot, which was later also used as a railway station. Since 1952, Bischdorf was part of the Bezirk Cottbus in the German Democratic Republic. In 1960, the mining of lignite began. As a result, three buildings inside the village had to be demolished. After the German reunification, Bischdorf became part of the state Brandenburg. In 1996, the lignite mining ended and the former quarry was turned into a lake.

On 1 January 1969, the then municipality Bischdorf annexed the municipality Seese with its district Mlode. In the same year, Seese was destroyed in favor of lignite mining. On 1 June 1987, Mlode regained independence as a municipality, it is now a district of Calau (since 2003). On 1 January 1987, the Gemarkung of the former village Kahnsdorf became part of Bischdorf. Bischdorf itself was annexed by Lübbenau on 26 October 2003.

In the 1990s, the village green and the village pond were redesigned and the streets in the village were repaved, and the schoolhouse was developed as a clubhouse. Footpaths were laid out and street lighting was newly installed.

== Demographics ==
Lübbenau/Spreewald: Population development
within the former municipality boundaries (2002)

Year	Pop.	±% p.a.
1875	282	—
1890	307	+0.57%
1910	376	+1.02%
1925	366	−0.18%
1933	331	−1.25%
1939	331	+0.00%
1946	488	+5.70%
1950	471	−0.88%
1964	325	−2.62%

Year	Pop.	±% p.a.
1971	425	+3.91%
1981	377	−1.19%
1985	339	−2.62%
1989	235	−8.75%
1990	233	−0.85%
1991	235	+0.86%
1992	232	−1.28%
1993	230	−0.86%
1994	217	−5.65%

Year	Pop.	±% p.a.
1995	213	−1.84%
1996	222	+4.23%
1997	219	−1.35%
1998	233	+6.39%
1999	229	−1.72%
2000	226	−1.31%
2001	219	−3.10%
2002	217	−0.91%
