= Schwarzbach, Brandenburg =

Schwarzbach
- Municipality
- Location of Schwarzbach within Oberspreewald-Lausitz district
- Interactive map of Schwarzbach
- Location within Germany Location within Brandenburg
- Coordinates: 51°27′00″N 13°55′59″E
- Country: Germany
- State: Brandenburg
- District: Oberspreewald-Lausitz
- Municipal assoc.: Ruhland

Government
  - Mayor (2024–29): Karl-Heinz Marschka

Area
  - Total: 15.79 km^{2} (6.10 sq mi)
- Elevation: 100 m (330 ft)

Population (2025-12-31)
  - Total: 654
  - Density: 41.4/km^{2} (107/sq mi)
- Time zone: UTC+01:00 (CET)
  - Summer (DST): UTC+02:00 (CEST)
- Postal codes: 01945
- Dialling codes: 035752
- Vehicle registration: OSL
- Website: www.schwarzbach-biehlen.de

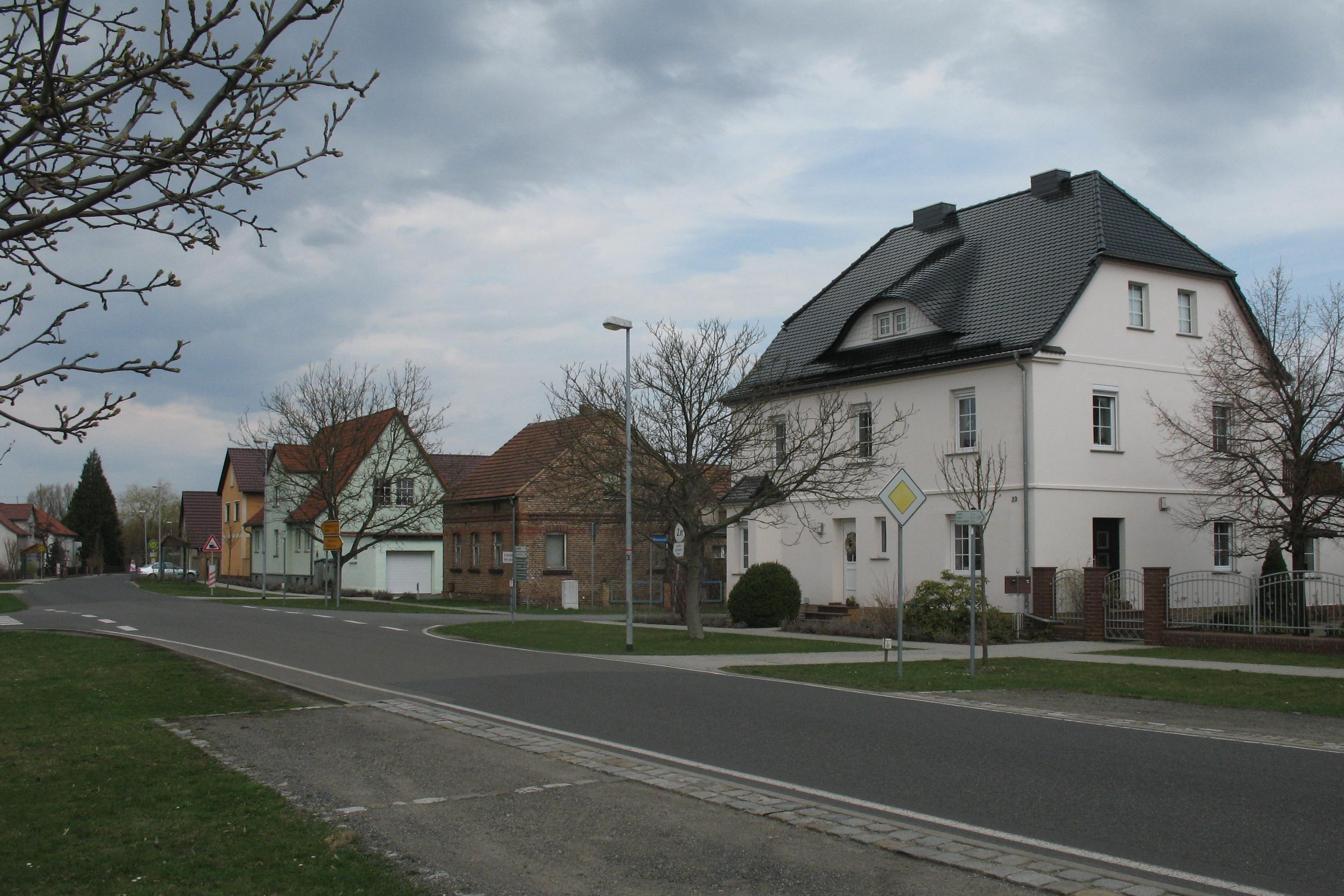
Schwarzbach

Schwarzbach (German pronunciation: [ˈʃvaʁtsˌbax]; Upper Sorbian: Čornja Rěka; Lower Sorbian: Čorny potok) is a municipality in the Oberspreewald-Lausitz district, in Upper Lusatia, Brandenburg, Germany.

== History ==
From 1815 to 1824, Schwarzbach was part of the Prussian Province of Brandenburg. From 1825 to 1919 it was part of the Province of Silesia, from 1919 to 1938 of the Province of Lower Silesia, from 1938 to 1941 again of the Province of Silesia and from 1941 to 1945 again of the Province of Lower Silesia. From 1945 to 1952 it was part of Saxony and from 1952 to 1990 of the Bezirk Cottbus of East Germany.

== Demography ==
Development of Population since 1875 within the Current Boundaries (Blue Line: Population; Dotted Line: Comparison to Population Development of Brandenburg state; Grey Background: Time of Nazi rule; Red Background: Time of Communist rule)

Schwarzbach: Population development
within the current boundaries (2013)

Year	Pop.	±% p.a.
1875	540	—
1890	580	+0.48%
1910	750	+1.29%
1925	776	+0.23%
1933	788	+0.19%
1939	840	+1.07%
1946	953	+1.82%
1950	954	+0.03%
1964	868	−0.67%
1971	847	−0.35%
1981	839	−0.09%
1985	768	−2.19%
1989	763	−0.16%
1990	735	−3.67%
1991	708	−3.67%
1992	717	+1.27%
1993	723	+0.84%
1994	730	+0.97%
1995	745	+2.05%
1996	760	+2.01%

Year	Pop.	±% p.a.
1997	780	+2.63%
1998	784	+0.51%
1999	786	+0.26%
2000	782	−0.51%
2001	791	+1.15%
2002	803	+1.52%
2003	815	+1.49%
2004	800	−1.84%
2005	778	−2.75%
2006	768	−1.29%
2007	759	−1.17%
2008	759	+0.00%
2009	735	−3.16%
2010	725	−1.36%
2011	701	−3.31%
2012	699	−0.29%
2013	679	−2.86%
2014	679	+0.00%
2015	671	−1.18%
2016	662	−1.34%
