= Grünewald, Germany =

Grünewald
- Municipality
- Location of Grünewald within Oberspreewald-Lausitz district
- Interactive map of Grünewald
- Location within Germany Location within Brandenburg
- Coordinates: 51°24′N 14°00′E
- Country: Germany
- State: Brandenburg
- District: Oberspreewald-Lausitz
- Municipal assoc.: Ruhland

Government
  - Mayor (2020–25): Marcus Scholze

Area
  - Total: 13.44 km^{2} (5.19 sq mi)
- Elevation: 132 m (433 ft)

Population (2025-12-31)
  - Total: 520
  - Density: 39/km^{2} (100/sq mi)
- Time zone: UTC+01:00 (CET)
  - Summer (DST): UTC+02:00 (CEST)
- Postal codes: 01945
- Dialling codes: 035756
- Vehicle registration: OSL

Grünewald (Lower Sorbian: Zelena góla) is a municipality in the Oberspreewald-Lausitz district, in Upper Lusatia, Brandenburg, Germany.

== History ==
From 1815 to 1825, Grünewald was part of the Prussian Province of Brandenburg, from 1825 to 1919 of the Province of Silesia, from 1919 to 1938 of the Province of Lower Silesia, again from 1938 to 1941 of the Province of Silesia and again from 1941 to 1945 of the Province of Lower Silesia. From 1945 to 1952, it was part of Saxony and from 1952 to 1990 of the Bezirk Cottbus of East Germany. The municipality includes the inhabited district of Sella.

== Demography ==
Development of Population since 1875 within the Current Boundaries (Blue Line: Population; Dotted Line: Comparison to Population Development of Brandenburg state; Grey Background: Time of Nazi rule; Red Background: Time of Communist rule)

Grünewald: Population development
within the current boundaries (2013)

Year	Pop.	±% p.a.
1875	250	—
1890	260	+0.26%
1910	400	+2.18%
1925	544	+2.07%
1933	593	+1.08%
1939	823	+5.61%
1946	919	+1.59%
1950	956	+0.99%
1964	887	−0.53%
1971	854	−0.54%
1981	780	−0.90%
1985	755	−0.81%
1989	742	−0.43%
1990	736	−0.81%
1991	718	−2.45%
1992	718	+0.00%
1993	720	+0.28%
1994	721	+0.14%
1995	725	+0.55%
1996	724	−0.14%

Year	Pop.	±% p.a.
1997	718	−0.83%
1998	709	−1.25%
1999	703	−0.85%
2000	688	−2.13%
2001	683	−0.73%
2002	659	−3.51%
2003	652	−1.06%
2004	641	−1.69%
2005	635	−0.94%
2006	625	−1.57%
2007	608	−2.72%
2008	600	−1.32%
2009	602	+0.33%
2010	587	−2.49%
2011	572	−2.56%
2012	555	−2.97%
2013	546	−1.62%
2014	543	−0.55%
2015	537	−1.10%
2016	519	−3.35%
