= Guteborn =

- Municipality
- Location of Guteborn within Oberspreewald-Lausitz district
- Interactive map of Guteborn
- Location within Germany Location within Brandenburg
- Coordinates: 51°25′00″N 13°55′59″E
- Country: Germany
- State: Brandenburg
- District: Oberspreewald-Lausitz
- Municipal assoc.: Ruhland

Government
  - Mayor (2024–29): Ralf Pavlik

Area
  - Total: 16.65 km^{2} (6.43 sq mi)
- Elevation: 114 m (374 ft)

Population (2025-12-31)
  - Total: 533
  - Density: 32.0/km^{2} (82.9/sq mi)
- Time zone: UTC+01:00 (CET)
  - Summer (DST): UTC+02:00 (CEST)
- Postal codes: 01945
- Dialling codes: 035752
- Vehicle registration: OSL
- Website: www.amt-ruhland.de

Guteborn (Upper Sorbian Wudwor; Lower Sorbian: Dobryborn) is a municipality in the Oberspreewald-Lausitz district of Upper Lusatia, Brandenburg, Germany.

== History ==
From 1815 to 1825, Guteborn was part of the Prussian Province of Brandenburg, from 1825 to 1919 of the Province of Silesia, from 1919 to 1938 of the Province of Lower Silesia, again from 1938 to 1941 of the Province of Silesia and again from 1941 to 1945 of the Province of Lower Silesia. From 1945 to 1952 it was part of Saxony and from 1952 to 1990 of the Bezirk Cottbus of East Germany.

== Demography ==
Development of Population since 1875 within the Current Boundaries (Blue Line: Population; Dotted Line: Comparison to Population Development of Brandenburg state; Grey Background: Time of Nazi rule; Red Background: Time of Communist rule)

Guteborn: Population development
within the current boundaries (2013)

Year	Pop.	±% p.a.
1875	300	—
1890	350	+1.03%
1910	400	+0.67%
1925	507	+1.59%
1933	573	+1.54%
1939	617	+1.24%
1946	679	+1.38%
1950	747	+2.41%
1964	797	+0.46%
1971	784	−0.23%
1981	664	−1.65%
1985	668	+0.15%
1989	670	+0.07%
1990	673	+0.45%
1991	654	−2.82%
1992	641	−1.99%
1993	645	+0.62%
1994	654	+1.40%
1995	662	+1.22%
1996	653	−1.36%

Year	Pop.	±% p.a.
1997	664	+1.68%
1998	674	+1.51%
1999	671	−0.45%
2000	666	−0.75%
2001	653	−1.95%
2002	643	−1.53%
2003	644	+0.16%
2004	624	−3.11%
2005	624	+0.00%
2006	601	−3.69%
2007	598	−0.50%
2008	590	−1.34%
2009	576	−2.37%
2010	580	+0.69%
2011	552	−4.83%
2012	533	−3.44%
2013	545	+2.25%
2014	537	−1.47%
2015	542	+0.93%
2016	533	−1.66%
