= Hermsdorf, Brandenburg =

Hermsdorf
- Municipality
- Location of Hermsdorf within Oberspreewald-Lausitz district
- Interactive map of Hermsdorf
- Location within Germany Location within Brandenburg
- Coordinates: 51°25′00″N 13°54′00″E
- Country: Germany
- State: Brandenburg
- District: Oberspreewald-Lausitz
- Municipal assoc.: Ruhland

Government
  - Mayor (2024–29): Matthias Trentzsch (Ind.)

Area
  - Total: 32.82 km^{2} (12.67 sq mi)
- Elevation: 112 m (367 ft)

Population (2025-12-31)
  - Total: 703
  - Density: 21.4/km^{2} (55.5/sq mi)
- Time zone: UTC+01:00 (CET)
  - Summer (DST): UTC+02:00 (CEST)
- Postal codes: 01945
- Dialling codes: 035752
- Vehicle registration: OSL
- Website: www.amt-ruhland.de

Hermsdorf (German pronunciation: [ˈhɛʁmsˌdɔʁf]; Lower Sorbian: Lubušow; Upper Sorbian: Hermanecy) is a municipality in the Oberspreewald-Lausitz district, in Upper Lusatia, Brandenburg, Germany.

== History ==
From 1815 to 1825, Hermsdorf was part of the Prussian Province of Brandenburg, from 1825 to 1919 of the Province of Silesia, from 1919 to 1938 of the Province of Lower Silesia, again from 1938 to 1941 of the Province of Silesia and again from 1941 to 1945 of the Province of Lower Silesia. From 1945 to 1952 it was part of Saxony and from 1952 to 1990 of the Bezirk Cottbus of East Germany.

== Demography ==
Development of Population since 1875 within the Current Boundaries (Blue Line: Population; Dotted Line: Comparison to Population Development of Brandenburg state; Grey Background: Time of Nazi rule; Red Background: Time of Communist rule)

Hermsdorf: Population development
within the current boundaries (2013)

Year	Pop.	±% p.a.
1875	400	—
1890	400	+0.00%
1910	550	+1.61%
1925	593	+0.50%
1933	575	−0.38%
1939	836	+6.44%
1946	1,122	+4.29%
1950	1,236	+2.45%
1964	1,263	+0.15%
1971	1,210	−0.61%
1981	1,091	−1.03%
1985	1,043	−1.12%
1989	1,045	+0.05%
1990	1,040	−0.48%
1991	1,034	−0.58%
1992	1,020	−1.35%
1993	1,010	−0.98%
1994	1,023	+1.29%
1995	1,007	−1.56%
1996	1,010	+0.30%

Year	Pop.	±% p.a.
1997	1,019	+0.89%
1998	1,013	−0.59%
1999	1,014	+0.10%
2000	1,020	+0.59%
2001	1,029	+0.88%
2002	952	−7.48%
2003	942	−1.05%
2004	930	−1.27%
2005	924	−0.65%
2006	908	−1.73%
2007	893	−1.65%
2008	874	−2.13%
2009	856	−2.06%
2010	839	−1.99%
2011	813	−3.10%
2012	808	−0.62%
2013	803	−0.62%
2014	795	−1.00%
2015	797	+0.25%
2016	796	−0.13%
