= Lübbenau =

Lübbenau/Spreewald Lubnjow
- Town
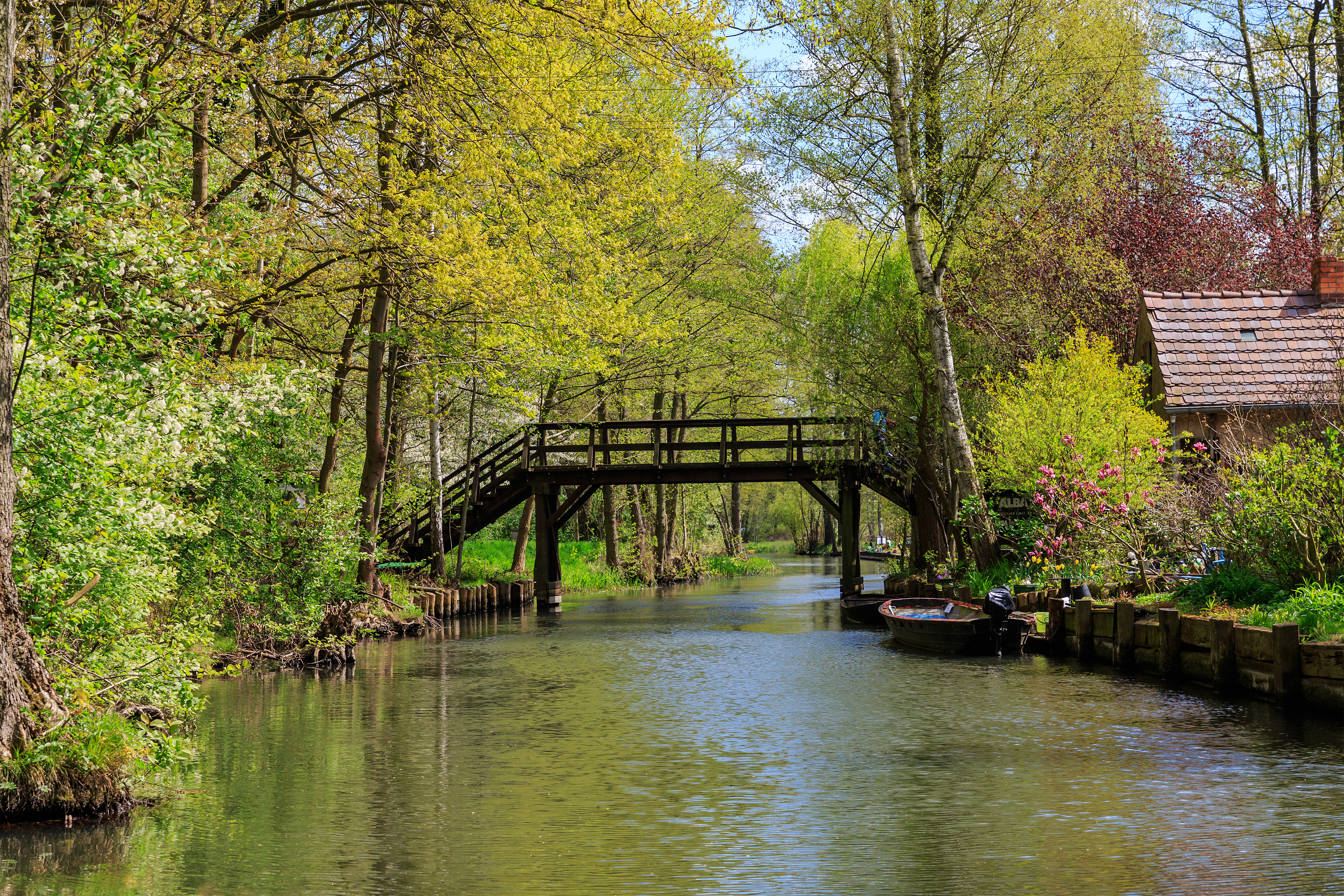
- Typical view in Lübbenau-Lehde

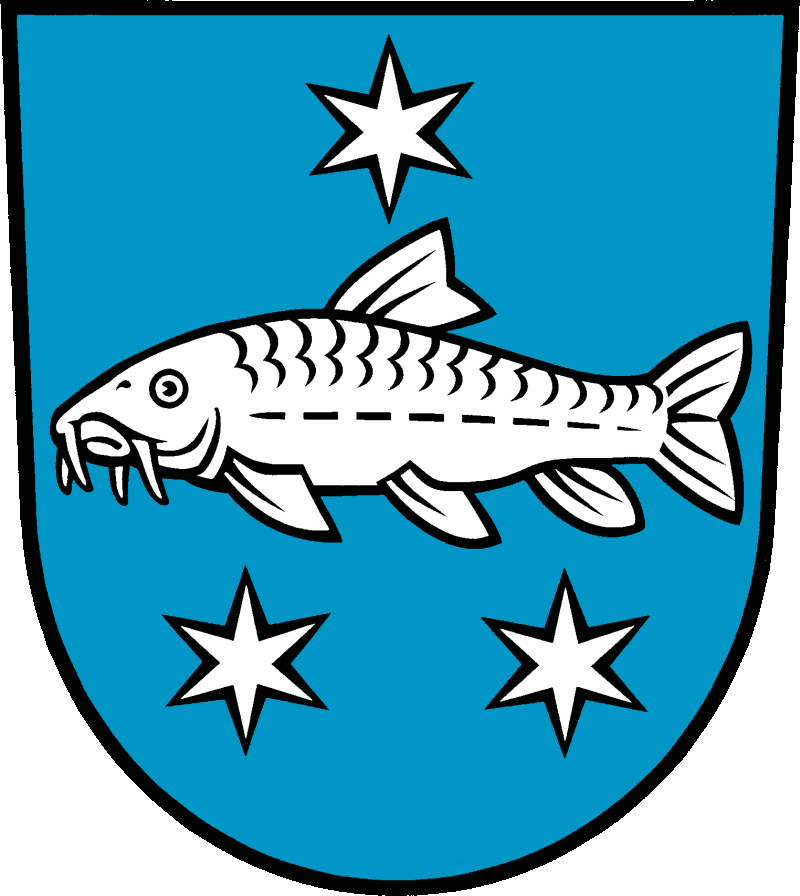
- Coat of arms

- Location of Lübbenau/Spreewald; Lubnjow within Oberspreewald-Lausitz district
- Interactive map of Lübbenau/Spreewald; Lubnjow
- Location within Germany Location within Brandenburg
- Coordinates: 51°52′N 13°58′E
- Country: Germany
- State: Brandenburg
- District: Oberspreewald-Lausitz

Government
  - Mayor (2024–32): Helmut Wenzel (Ind.)

Area
  - Total: 139.4 km^{2} (53.8 sq mi)
- Elevation: 52 m (171 ft)

Population (2025-12-31)
  - Total: 15,729
  - Density: 112.8/km^{2} (292.2/sq mi)
- Demonym(s): German: Lübbenauer; Lower Sorbian: Lubnjowaŕ (m.), Lubnjowaŕka (f.)
- Time zone: UTC+01:00 (CET)
  - Summer (DST): UTC+02:00 (CEST)
- Postal codes: 03222
- Dialling codes: 03542
- Vehicle registration: OSL, CA, SFB
- Website: www.luebbenau-spreewald.de

Lübbenau (German pronunciation: [lʏbəˈnaʊ], Lower Sorbian: Lubnjow [ˈlubnʲɔw]; officially Lübbenau/Spreewald, L.S. Lubnjow/Błota [ˈbwɔta] (meaning Lübbenau/Spree Forest) is a town in the Upper Spree Forest-Lusatia District of Brandenburg, Germany. It is located in the bilingual German/Sorbian region of (Lower) Lusatia, on the river Spree, where this forms a large inland delta surrounded by woodland, called "Spree Forest", about 82 km (51 mi) southeast of Berlin. The town is best known through the incorporated villages of Lehde/Lědy and Leipe/Lipje, villages where there just exist anabranches of the Spree River instead of streets.

== Administration ==
The town of Lübbenau consists of (German/Lower Sorbian):

- Lübbenau/Spreewald (Lubnjow/Błota) with Kaupen (Kupy), Neustadt (Nowe Město), Stennewitz (Sćenojce), Stottoff (Štotup), and Wotschofska (Wótšowska)

and the incorporated villages of:

- Bischdorf (Wótšowc)
- Boblitz (Bobolce)
- Groß Beuchow (Buchow) with Klein Beuchow (Buchojc)
- Groß Klessow (Klěšow) with Klein Klessow (Klěšojc) and Redlitz (Rědłojce)
- Groß Lübbenau (Lubń) with Scheddis (Pśedejs)
- Hindenberg (Želnjojce)
- Klein Radden (Radyńc) with Groß Radden (Radyń)
- Kittlitz (Dłopje) with Eisdorf (Stańšojce), Lichtenau (Lichtnow), and Schönfeld (Tłukom)
- Krimnitz (Kśimnice)
- Lehde (Lědy) with Dolzke (Dolck)
- Leipe (Lipje) with Dubkowmühle (Dubkowy Młyn), Eiche (Duby), Konzaks Horst (Kóńcakojc Wótšow), and Pohlenzschänke (Póleńcowa Kjarcma)
- Ragow (Rogow)
- Zerkwitz (Cerkwica)

== History ==
Lübbenau was first mentioned in a sales document in 1315 but is believed to be much older due to excavations below the castle that show settlement from the 8th or 9th century.

From 1364 to 1635, Lübbenau was part of the Kingdom of Bohemia, and then until 1815 Lübbenau was a part of the Electorate of Saxony. From 1815 to 1947, Lübbenau was part of the Prussian Province of Brandenburg. From 1952 to 1990, it was part of the Bezirk Cottbus of East Germany.

== Demography ==
Development of population since 1875 within the current Boundaries (Blue Line: Population; Dotted Line: Comparison to Population development in Brandenburg state; Grey Background: Time of Nazi Germany; Red Background: Time of communist East Germany)

Recent Population Development and Projections (Population Development before Census 2011 (blue line); Recent Population Development according to the Census in Germany in 2011 (blue bordered line); Official projections for 2005–2030 (yellow line); for 2017–2030 (scarlet line); for 2020–2030 (green line)

Lübbenau/Spreewald: Population development
within the current boundaries (2020)

Year	Pop.	±% p.a.
1875	10,174	—
1890	10,359	+0.12%
1910	10,549	+0.09%
1925	10,526	−0.01%
1939	9,672	−0.60%
1950	12,986	+2.71%
1964	22,542	+4.02%

Year	Pop.	±% p.a.
1971	26,192	+2.17%
1981	25,270	−0.36%
1985	24,295	−0.98%
1990	23,854	−0.37%
1995	22,182	−1.44%
2000	19,959	−2.09%
2005	17,808	−2.25%

Year	Pop.	±% p.a.
2010	16,820	−1.14%
2015	16,237	−0.70%
2016	16,109	−0.79%
2017	16,090	−0.12%
2018	16,021	−0.43%
2019	15,977	−0.27%
2020	15,969	−0.05%

== Sights ==
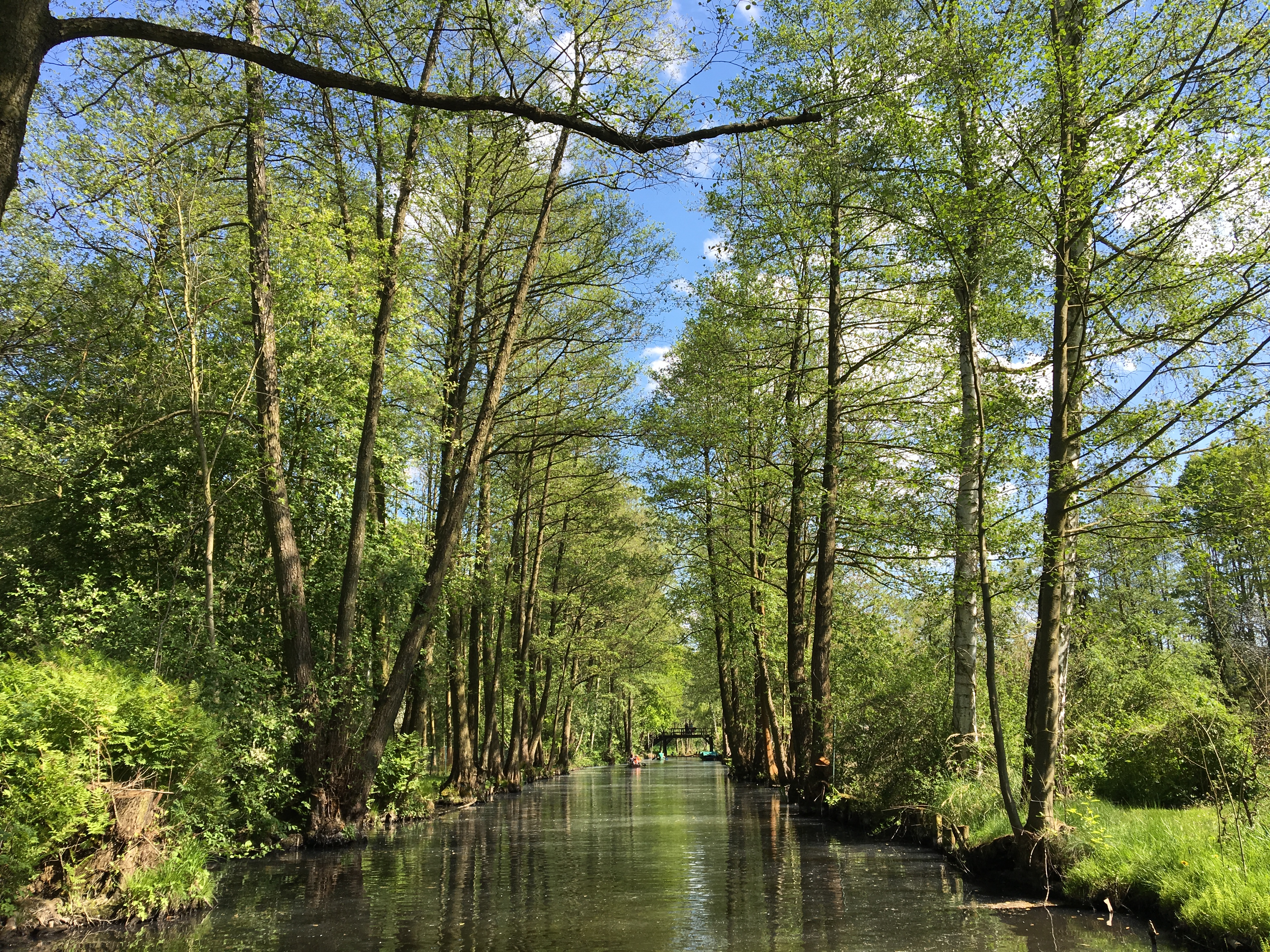
The Spreewald in Lübbenau

Lübbenau offers a variety of sights. Departing from the old town center, visitors can explore the marina with its traditional boats, or a castle which set in a nicely arranged park, including an orangerie with a cafe and a hotel. There are cycling routes to nearby villages, and boat rides are popular with tourists. The city wall's history dates back to the Middle Ages and the museum next to the city gate offers insights into the architecture as well as the rich history of the region.

== Twin towns – sister cities ==
Lübbenau is twinned with:

- Halluin, France
- Kočevje, Slovenia
- Nowogród Bobrzański, Poland
- Oer-Erkenschwick, Germany
- Pniewy, Poland
- Świdnica, Poland

== Notable people ==
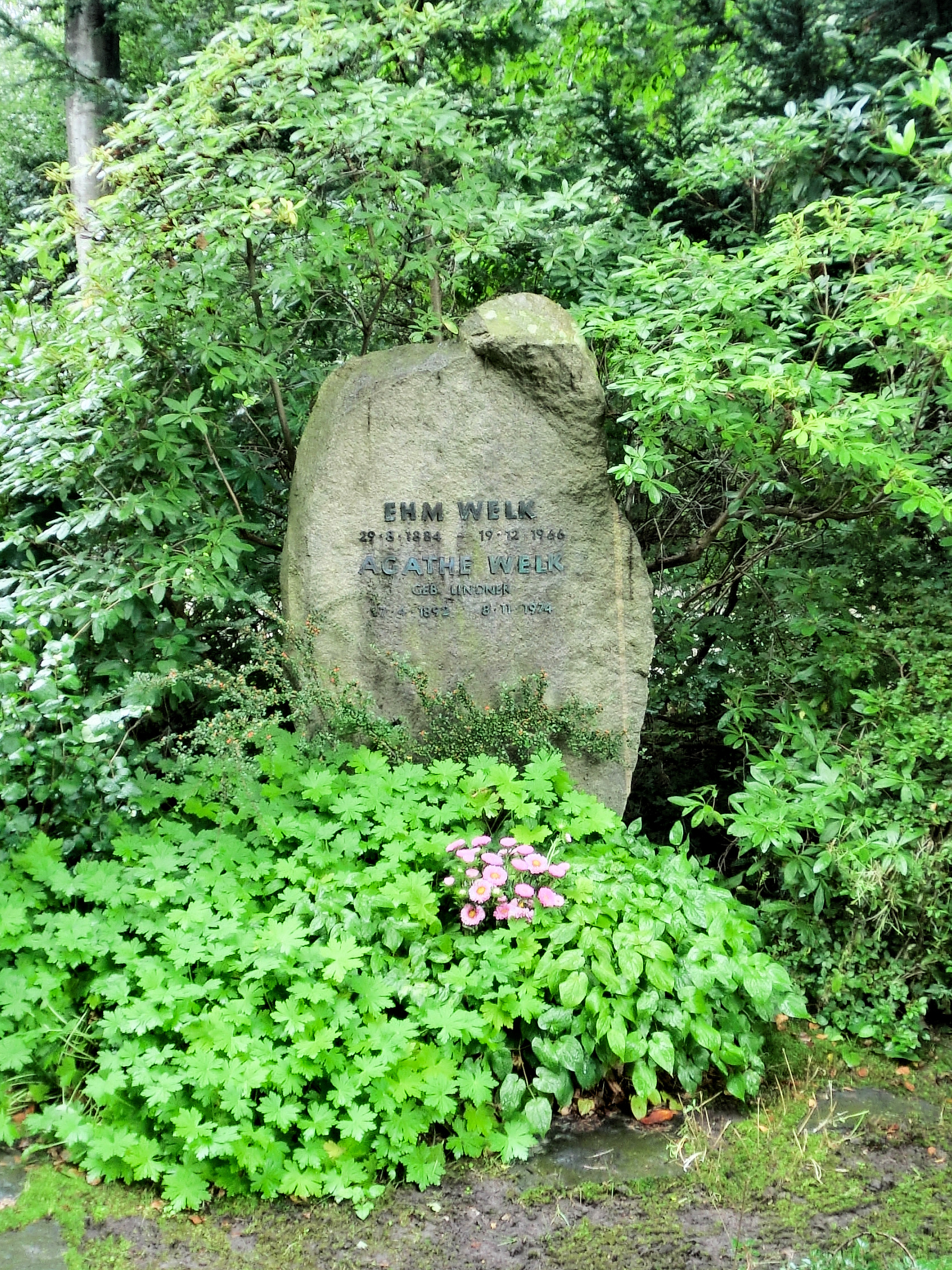
Bad Doberan cemetery grave of Ehm Welk

- Romy Müller (born 1958), track and field athlete and Olympic champion
- Jens Riewa (born 1963), presenter and newscaster of the Tagesschau

=== Associated with the town ===
- Ehm Welk (1884–1966), writer, lived for a time in Lübbenau
- Nico (1938–1988), civil Christa Päffgen, model and singer, lived as a child in Lübbenau
- Marc Huster (born 1970), weight lifter, grew up in Lübbenau
