= Burchard of Ursperg =

Burchard of Ursperg, also called Burchard of Biberach (c.1177–1230/1) was a German priest and chronicler. His Ursperger Chronicle (or Chronicon Urspergensis) is the most important universal history of the late Staufer era.

What is known of Burchard's life is drawn mainly from his chronicle. He was born in the imperial free city of Biberach in the Duchy of Swabia. He was at the Papal court in 1198–99 and was ordained a priest at Constance in 1202. He joined the Premonstratensian Schussenried Abbey in 1205 and became its provost in 1209. He spent 1210–11 at the Papal court again before he was called to Ursperg Abbey in 1215 to serve as provost. He wrote his chronicle there in 1229/30. He died on 11 January in either 1230 or 1231. Burchard was succeeded as provost by Conrad of Lichtenau, who was long thought to have finished his chronicle or at least edited it.

The Ursperger Chronicle, composed in Latin prose, begins with the legendary King Ninus, founder of Nineveh, and extends to the year 1229. For the earlier part Burchard uses Ekkehard of Aura and Frutolf of Michelsberg. During his two stays in Rome he gathered information in the papal Regesta. Although a partisan of the Staufer, he made use of the Historia Welforum of their chief rivals, the Welfs. His original work, drawing on events he witnessed or had heard about from witnesses, starts with the last years of Henry VI.

The autograph of Burchard's chronicle was lost to fire in the 16th century. His critiques of papal policy made him a favourite among early Protestants. This led to the Chronicle's being placed on the Catholic Index of Prohibited Books in 1575, a sentence lifted by Cardinal Bellarmine in 1593. Caspar Hedio added a Protestant continuation to bring the Chronicon down to 1537. The first edition was brought out by Miller and Foeniseca at Augsburg in 1515 from a copy in the possession of Konrad Peutinger. Another edition by Melanchthon and Mylius appeared at Basel in 1569, erroneously attributing the sole authorship of the chronicle to Burchard's successor, Conrad. The last edition was printed at Strasbourg in 1609.
