= Ruhland =

- Town
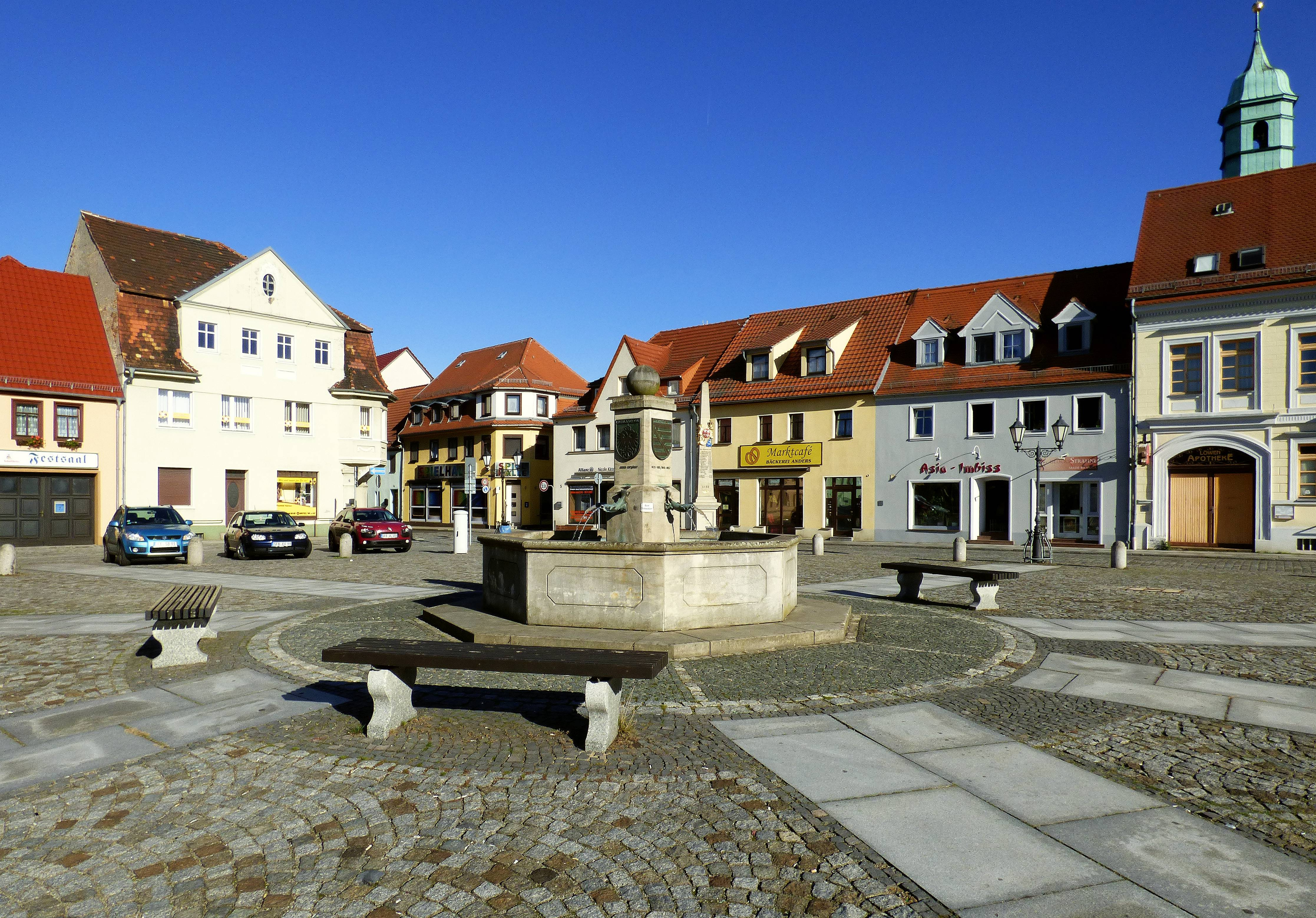
- Town square

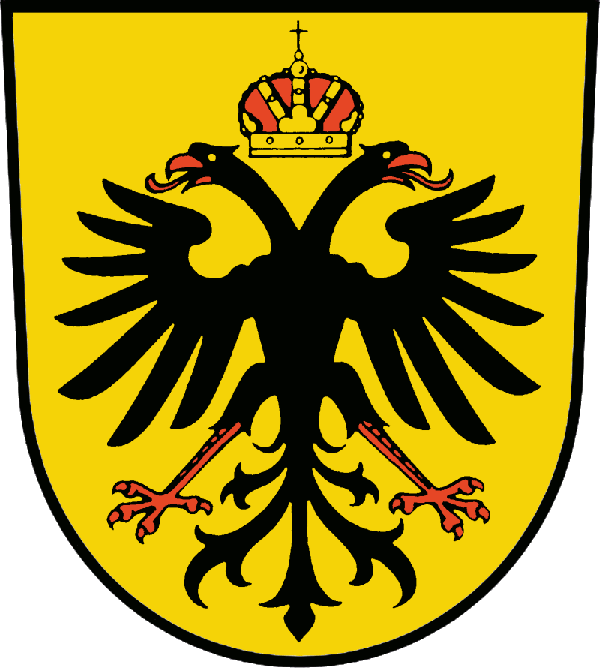
- Coat of arms

- Location of Ruhland within Oberspreewald-Lausitz district
- Interactive map of Ruhland
- Location within Germany Location within Brandenburg
- Coordinates: 51°28′00″N 13°52′00″E
- Country: Germany
- State: Brandenburg
- District: Oberspreewald-Lausitz
- Municipal assoc.: Ruhland

Government
  - Mayor (2024–29): Thomas Höntsch (SPD)

Area
  - Total: 37.22 km^{2} (14.37 sq mi)
- Elevation: 96 m (315 ft)

Population (2025-12-31)
  - Total: 3,713
  - Density: 99.76/km^{2} (258.4/sq mi)
- Time zone: UTC+01:00 (CET)
  - Summer (DST): UTC+02:00 (CEST)
- Postal codes: 01945
- Dialling codes: 035752
- Vehicle registration: OSL
- Website: www.ruhland.de

Ruhland (German pronunciation: [ˈʁuːlant]; Sorbian languages: Rólany) is a town in the Oberspreewald-Lausitz district, in Upper Lusatia, Brandenburg, in eastern Germany. It is situated on the river Schwarze Elster, 12 kilometres (7.5 mi) southwest of Senftenberg.

Ruhland station is a major railway junction, for freight and for passenger services.

== History ==
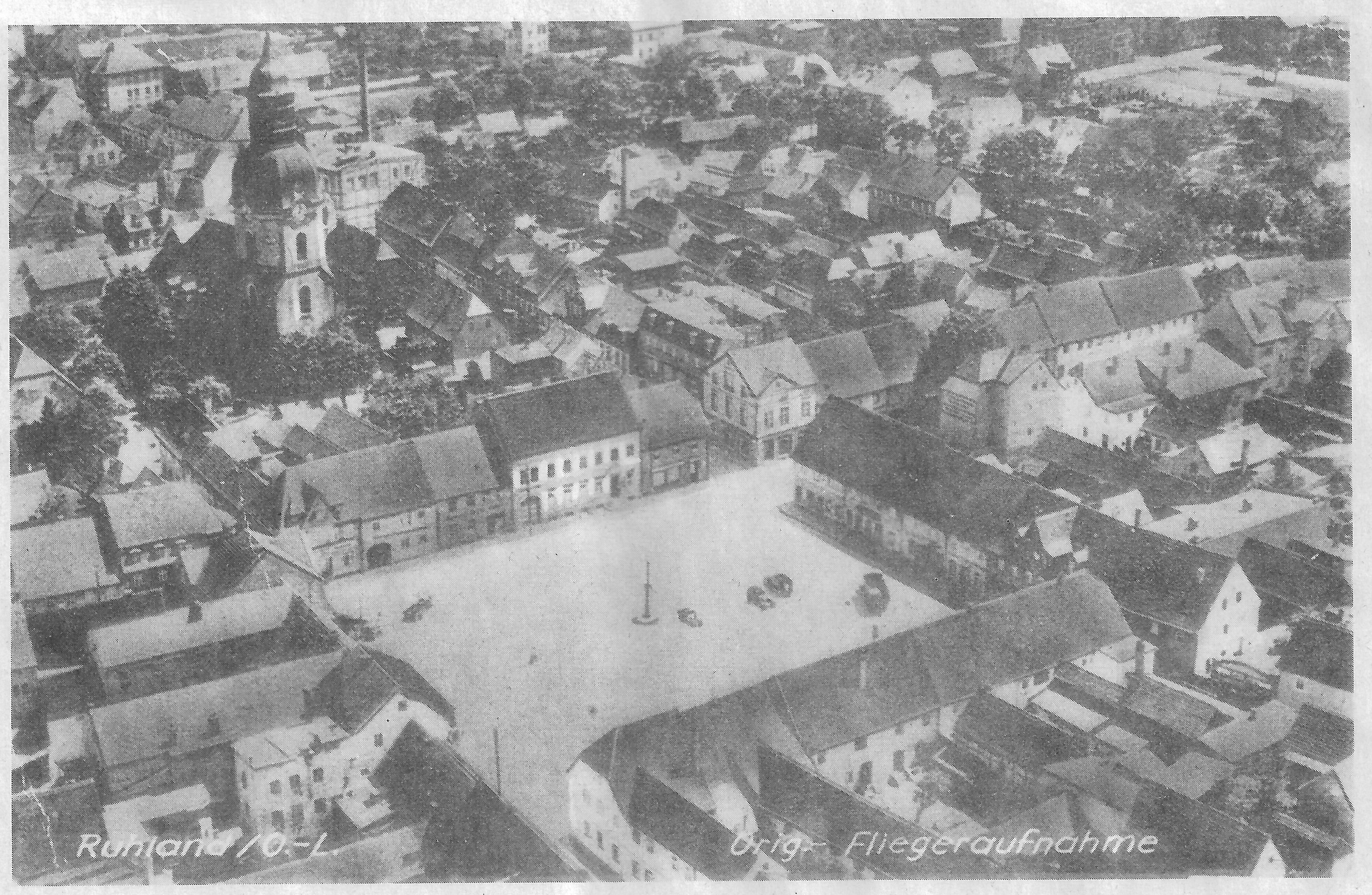
Aerial view from 1915

It was first mentioned in 1317. The town was at various times ruled by Bohemian, Hungarian, Saxon and Polish monarchs, before it was annexed by Prussia in 1815. In 1705, the town was visited twice by Augustus II the Strong. From 1815 to 1825, Ruhland was part of the Province of Brandenburg, from 1825 to 1919 of the Province of Silesia, from 1919 to 1938 of the Province of Lower Silesia, again from 1938 to 1941 of the Province of Silesia and again from 1941 to 1945 of the Province of Lower Silesia. From 1945 to 1952 it was part of Saxony and from 1952 to 1990 of the Bezirk Cottbus of East Germany.

== Demography ==
Development of Population since 1875 within the Current Boundaries (Blue Line: Population; Dotted Line: Comparison to Population Development of Brandenburg state; Grey Background: Time of Nazi rule; Red Background: Time of Communist rule)

Ruhland: Population development
within the current boundaries (2018)

Year	Pop.	±% p.a.
1875	2,086	—
1890	2,358	+0.82%
1910	3,126	+1.42%
1925	3,768	+1.25%
1933	4,137	+1.17%
1939	4,864	+2.73%
1946	5,440	+1.61%
1950	5,664	+1.01%
1964	5,325	−0.44%
1971	5,232	−0.25%
1981	4,670	−1.13%
1985	4,612	−0.31%
1989	4,413	−1.10%
1990	4,325	−1.99%
1991	4,191	−3.10%
1992	4,131	−1.43%
1993	4,080	−1.23%
1994	4,052	−0.69%
1995	4,037	−0.37%
1996	4,089	+1.29%
1997	4,134	+1.10%

Year	Pop.	±% p.a.
1998	4,178	+1.06%
1999	4,232	+1.29%
2000	4,262	+0.71%
2001	4,215	−1.10%
2002	4,157	−1.38%
2003	4,121	−0.87%
2004	4,093	−0.68%
2005	4,106	+0.32%
2006	4,043	−1.53%
2007	3,982	−1.51%
2008	3,948	−0.85%
2009	3,935	−0.33%
2010	3,896	−0.99%
2011	3,819	−1.98%
2012	3,754	−1.70%
2013	3,747	−0.19%
2014	3,693	−1.44%
2015	3,665	−0.76%
2016	3,693	+0.76%
2017	3,655	−1.03%
2018	3,672	+0.47%
