= Ruhland (Amt) =

- Amt
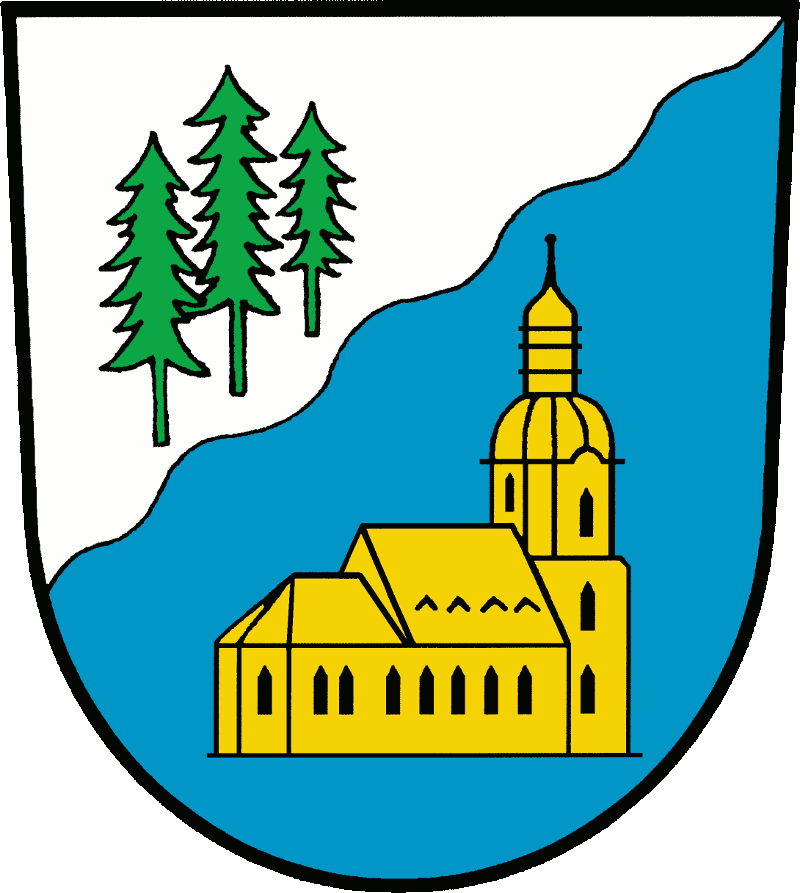
- Coat of arms

- Map of Oberspreewald-Lausitz highlighting Ruhland
- Interactive map of Ruhland
- Location within Germany Location within Brandenburg
- Coordinates: 51°27′N 13°52′E
- Country: Germany
- State: Brandenburg
- District: Oberspreewald-Lausitz
- Seat: Ruhland
- Subdivisions: 6 municipalities

Area
  - Total: 131.83 km^{2} (50.90 sq mi)

Population (2025-12-31)
  - Total: 7,103
  - Density: 53.88/km^{2} (139.5/sq mi)
- Time zone: UTC+01:00 (CET)
  - Summer (DST): UTC+02:00 (CEST)
- Website: www.amt-ruhland.de

Amt Ruhland is an Amt ("collective municipality") in the district of Oberspreewald-Lausitz, in Brandenburg, Germany. Its seat is in Ruhland.

The Amt Ruhland consists of the following municipalities:

1. Grünewald
2. Guteborn
3. Hermsdorf
4. Hohenbocka
5. Ruhland
6. Schwarzbach

== Demography ==
Development of Population since 1875 within the Current Boundaries (Blue Line: Population; Dotted Line: Comparison to Population Development of Brandenburg state; Grey Background: Time of Nazi rule; Red Background: Time of Communist rule)

Recent Population Development and Projections (Population Development before Census 2011 (blue line); Recent Population Development according to the Census in Germany in 2011 (blue bordered line); Official projections for 2005-2030 (yellow line); for 2017-2030 (scarlet line); for 2020-2030 (green line)

Amt Ruhland: Population development
within the current boundaries (2020)

Year	Pop.	±% p.a.
1875	4,276	—
1890	4,648	+0.56%
1910	6,226	+1.47%
1925	7,352	+1.11%
1939	9,518	+1.86%
1950	11,187	+1.48%
1964	10,605	−0.38%
1971	10,362	−0.33%
1981	9,313	−1.06%

Year	Pop.	±% p.a.
1985	9,027	−0.78%
1990	8,607	−0.95%
1995	8,285	−0.76%
2000	8,628	+0.81%
2005	8,244	−0.91%
2010	7,725	−1.29%
2015	7,170	−1.48%
2020	7,212	+0.12%
2025	7,103	−0.30%
