= Lichtenau, Lübbenau =

Lichtenau Lichtnow
- Ortsteil of Lübbenau
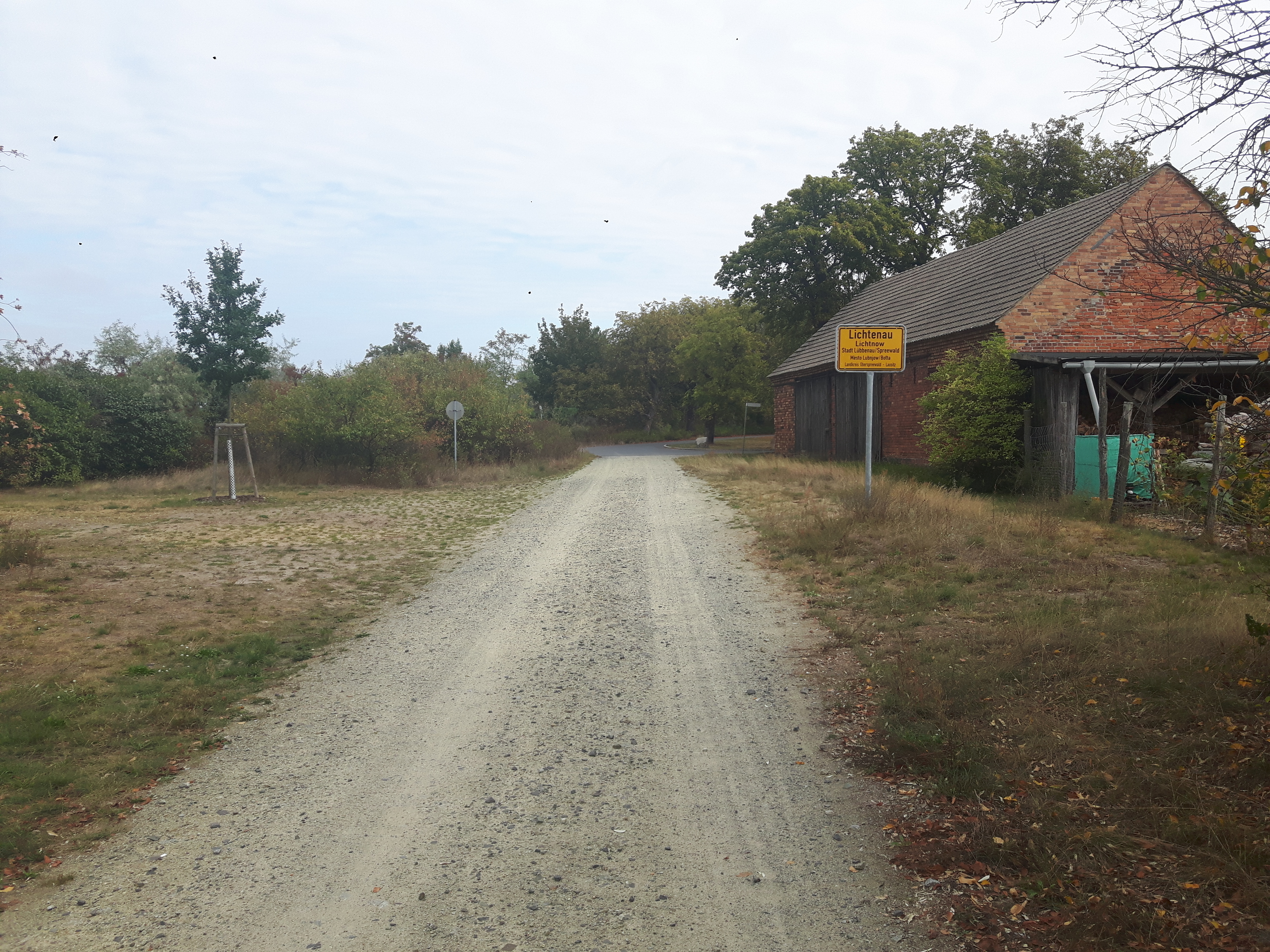
- Village entrance
- Interactive map of Lichtenau
- Location within Germany Location within Brandenburg
- Coordinates: 51°49′21″N 13°53′41″E
- Country: Germany
- State: Brandenburg
- District: Oberspreewald-Lausitz
- Town: Lübbenau
- Elevation: 60 m (200 ft)

Population (2017)
  - Total: 59
- Time zone: UTC+01:00 (CET)
  - Summer (DST): UTC+02:00 (CEST)
- Postal codes: 03222
- Dialling codes: 03542
- Vehicle registration: OSL, CA, SFB

Lichtenau (German pronunciation: [ˈlɪçtənaʊ]; Lower Sorbian: Lichtnow) is a village in the Oberspreewald-Lausitz district of Brandenburg, Germany. It is located in Lower Lusatia, about 90 km (55 mi) south of Berlin. The village was annexed by the municipality Tornow in 1926 (according to different sources in 1928), which was annexed itself by Kittlitz in 1968. Since 26 October 2003, Lichtenau is part of the town Lübbenau.

== History ==
Lichtenau was first mentioned in 1319 as Lichtenow. The name derived from the German term for a clearing. The Lower Sorbian name was first mentioned in 1761. From 1815 on, Lichtenau was a village in the prussian Province of Brandenburg, where it was part of the Luckau district. On 21 July 1875, the municipality of Lichtenau and Gutsbezirk of the same name merged to the new municipality of Lichtenau, which then became part of the Calau district. On 1 January 1928, Lichtenau became a district of Tornow.

In 1950, Lichtenau switched districts again, now becoming part of Lübben district. Two years later, Lichtenau became part of the Calau district again. From the 1960s on, quarries for lignite mining were opened around Lichtenau. As a result, the village of Tornow, to which Lichtenau belonged, was demolished and Lichtenau became part of Kittlitz on 25 January 1968. After the German reunification, Lichtenau became a part of the state Brandenburg. On 26 October 2003, the municipality of Kittlitz dissolved and Lichtenau became part of Lübbenau.

== Demographics ==
Lübbenau/Spreewald: Population development
within the former municipality boundaries (1926)

Year	Pop.	±% p.a.
1875	59	—
1890	60	+0.11%

Year	Pop.	±% p.a.
1910	74	+1.05%
1925	59	−1.50%
