= Neu-Seeland =

- Municipality
- Location of Neu-Seeland within Oberspreewald-Lausitz district
- Interactive map of Neu-Seeland
- Location within Germany Location within Brandenburg
- Coordinates: 51°37′00″N 14°05′59″E
- Country: Germany
- State: Brandenburg
- District: Oberspreewald-Lausitz
- Municipal assoc.: Altdöbern

Government
  - Mayor (2024–29): Marcus Lein (Ind.)

Area
  - Total: 56.18 km^{2} (21.69 sq mi)
- Elevation: 117 m (384 ft)

Population (2025-12-31)
  - Total: 547
  - Density: 9.74/km^{2} (25.2/sq mi)
- Time zone: UTC+01:00 (CET)
  - Summer (DST): UTC+02:00 (CEST)
- Postal codes: 01983 03103
- Dialling codes: 035751
- Vehicle registration: OSL

Neu-Seeland (Upper Sorbian: Nowa Jazorina) is a municipality in the Oberspreewald-Lausitz district, in Lower Lusatia, Brandenburg, Germany.

== History ==
From 1815 to 1947, the constituent localities of Neu-Seeland (Bahnsdorf, Lindchen, Lubochow and Ressen) were part of the Prussian Province of Brandenburg. From 1952 to 1990, they were part of the Bezirk Cottbus of East Germany. On 1 February 2002, the municipality of Neu-Seeland was formed by merging the municipalities of Bahnsdorf, Lindchen, Lubochow and Ressen.

== Demography ==
Development of Population since 1875 within the Current Boundaries (Blue Line: Population; Dotted Line: Comparison to Population Development of Brandenburg state; Grey Background: Time of Nazi rule; Red Background: Time of Communist rule)

Neu-Seeland: Population development
within the current boundaries (2013)

Year	Pop.	±% p.a.
1875	1,944	—
1890	1,940	−0.01%
1910	2,122	+0.45%
1925	2,160	+0.12%
1933	2,038	−0.72%
1939	1,870	−1.42%
1946	2,512	+4.31%
1950	2,481	−0.31%
1964	1,687	−2.72%
1971	1,572	−1.00%
1981	1,124	−3.30%
1985	1,000	−2.88%
1989	841	−4.24%
1990	814	−3.21%
1991	781	−4.05%
1992	1,443	+84.76%
1993	1,043	−27.72%
1994	1,125	+7.86%
1995	1,157	+2.84%
1996	1,235	+6.74%

Year	Pop.	±% p.a.
1997	1,169	−5.34%
1998	1,081	−7.53%
1999	1,199	+10.92%
2000	1,112	−7.26%
2001	1,153	+3.69%
2002	1,098	−4.77%
2003	1,098	+0.00%
2004	999	−9.02%
2005	929	−7.01%
2006	817	−12.06%
2007	801	−1.96%
2008	785	−2.00%
2009	607	−22.68%
2010	573	−5.60%
2011	630	+9.95%
2012	614	−2.54%
2013	606	−1.30%
2014	602	−0.66%
2015	585	−2.82%
2016	591	+1.03%
