= Conrad of Lichtenau =

German nobleman and priest (died 1240)

Conrad of Lichtenau (died 1240) was a German nobleman and priest who served as provost of Ursberg Abbey from 1230 or 1231 until his death.

Conrad descended from a noble family from Lichtenau in the Duchy of Swabia. He resided for some time at the Imperial court and later at the Papal court in Rome under Innocent III. It was probably there that he became a canon regular, afterwards to enter the Premonstratensian Order. After the death of Provost Burchard of Biberach in 1230 or 1231, Conrad became provost at Ursberg in Bavaria, where he died.

For many years, Conrad was believed to be the only author of the Chronicon Urspergense, a chronicle of world history for the time of King Ninus of Assyria to AD 1229. Later it came to be believed that the work was written in several parts by several different people. The first part, which covers the period up to 1125, was written, in part at least, by Ekkehard of Aura; a continuation, from 1126 to 1225, was added by Abbot Burchard of Biberach. Conrad himself continued the work to 1229 and made the final redaction. Today, Burchard is seen as the author of the whole.
