= Hohenbocka =

- Municipality
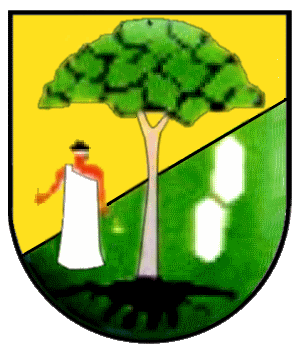
- Coat of arms

- Location of Hohenbocka within Oberspreewald-Lausitz district
- Interactive map of Hohenbocka
- Location within Germany Location within Brandenburg
- Coordinates: 51°25′59″N 14°00′00″E
- Country: Germany
- State: Brandenburg
- District: Oberspreewald-Lausitz
- Municipal assoc.: Ruhland

Government
  - Mayor (2024–29): Aina Gutschmidt

Area
  - Total: 15.59 km^{2} (6.02 sq mi)
- Elevation: 128 m (420 ft)

Population (2025-12-31)
  - Total: 980
  - Density: 63/km^{2} (160/sq mi)
- Time zone: UTC+01:00 (CET)
  - Summer (DST): UTC+02:00 (CEST)
- Postal codes: 01945
- Dialling codes: 035756
- Vehicle registration: OSL
- Website: www.amt-ruhland.de

Hohenbocka (Lower Sorbian Hory Bukow) is a municipality in the Oberspreewald-Lausitz district, in Upper Lusatia, Brandenburg, Germany.

== History ==
From 1815 to 1825, Hohenbocka was part of the Prussian Province of Brandenburg, from 1825 to 1919 of the Province of Silesia, from 1919 to 1938 of the Province of Lower Silesia, again from 1938 to 1941 of the Province of Silesia and again from 1941 to 1945 of the Province of Lower Silesia. From 1945 to 1952 it was part of Saxony and from 1952 to 1990 of the Bezirk Cottbus of East Germany.

== Demography ==
Development of Population since 1875 within the Current Boundaries (Blue Line: Population; Dotted Line: Comparison to Population Development of Brandenburg state; Grey Background: Time of Nazi rule; Red Background: Time of Communist rule)

Hohenbocka: Population development
within the current boundaries (2013)

Year	Pop.	±% p.a.
1875	700	—
1890	700	+0.00%
1910	1,000	+1.80%
1925	1,164	+1.02%
1933	1,300	+1.39%
1939	1,538	+2.84%
1946	1,697	+1.42%
1950	1,630	−1.00%
1964	1,465	−0.76%
1971	1,435	−0.30%
1981	1,269	−1.22%
1985	1,181	−1.78%
1989	1,134	−1.01%
1990	1,098	−3.17%
1991	1,082	−1.46%
1992	1,076	−0.55%
1993	1,092	+1.49%
1994	1,098	+0.55%
1995	1,109	+1.00%
1996	1,113	+0.36%

Year	Pop.	±% p.a.
1997	1,139	+2.34%
1998	1,165	+2.28%
1999	1,187	+1.89%
2000	1,210	+1.94%
2001	1,209	−0.08%
2002	1,195	−1.16%
2003	1,194	−0.08%
2004	1,191	−0.25%
2005	1,177	−1.18%
2006	1,161	−1.36%
2007	1,146	−1.29%
2008	1,127	−1.66%
2009	1,113	−1.24%
2010	1,098	−1.35%
2011	1,041	−5.19%
2012	1,022	−1.83%
2013	1,008	−1.37%
2014	965	−4.27%
2015	958	−0.73%
2016	978	+2.09%
