= Neupetershain =

- Municipality
- Location of Neupetershain within Oberspreewald-Lausitz district
- Interactive map of Neupetershain
- Location within Germany Location within Brandenburg
- Coordinates: 51°36′00″N 14°10′00″E
- Country: Germany
- State: Brandenburg
- District: Oberspreewald-Lausitz
- Municipal assoc.: Altdöbern

Government
  - Mayor (2024–29): Marita Theile

Area
  - Total: 18.8 km^{2} (7.3 sq mi)
- Elevation: 124 m (407 ft)

Population (2025-12-31)
  - Total: 1,174
  - Density: 62.4/km^{2} (162/sq mi)
- Time zone: UTC+01:00 (CET)
  - Summer (DST): UTC+02:00 (CEST)
- Postal codes: 03103
- Dialling codes: 035751
- Vehicle registration: OSL

Neupetershain (German pronunciation: [nɔʏˈpeːtɐshaɪn]; Lower Sorbian: Nowe Wiki, pronounced [ˈnɔwɛ ˈwʲikʲi]) is a municipality in the Oberspreewald-Lausitz district, in Lower Lusatia, Brandenburg, Germany.

== History ==
From 1815 to 1947, Neupetershain was part of the Prussian Province of Brandenburg. From 1952 to 1990, it was part of the Bezirk Cottbus of East Germany.

== Demography ==
Development of Population since 1875 within the Current Boundaries (Blue Line: Population; Dotted Line: Comparison to Population Development of Brandenburg state; Grey Background: Time of Nazi rule; Red Background: Time of Communist rule)

Neupetershain: Population development
within the current boundaries (2013)

Year	Pop.	±% p.a.
1875	562	—
1890	603	+0.47%
1910	2,557	+7.49%
1925	2,862	+0.75%
1933	3,085	+0.94%
1939	3,238	+0.81%
1946	3,657	+1.75%
1950	3,822	+1.11%
1964	3,060	−1.58%
1971	2,843	−1.05%
1981	2,401	−1.68%
1985	2,266	−1.44%
1989	2,176	−1.01%
1990	2,105	−3.26%
1991	2,019	−4.09%
1992	2,000	−0.94%
1993	1,990	−0.50%
1994	1,961	−1.46%
1995	1,940	−1.07%
1996	1,874	−3.40%

Year	Pop.	±% p.a.
1997	1,849	−1.33%
1998	1,846	−0.16%
1999	1,851	+0.27%
2000	1,827	−1.30%
2001	1,797	−1.64%
2002	1,717	−4.45%
2003	1,670	−2.74%
2004	1,642	−1.68%
2005	1,613	−1.77%
2006	1,553	−3.72%
2007	1,515	−2.45%
2008	1,473	−2.77%
2009	1,464	−0.61%
2010	1,433	−2.12%
2011	1,372	−4.26%
2012	1,314	−4.23%
2013	1,277	−2.82%
2014	1,246	−2.43%
2015	1,254	+0.64%
2016	1,229	−1.99%
