= Altdöbern (Amt) =

- Amt
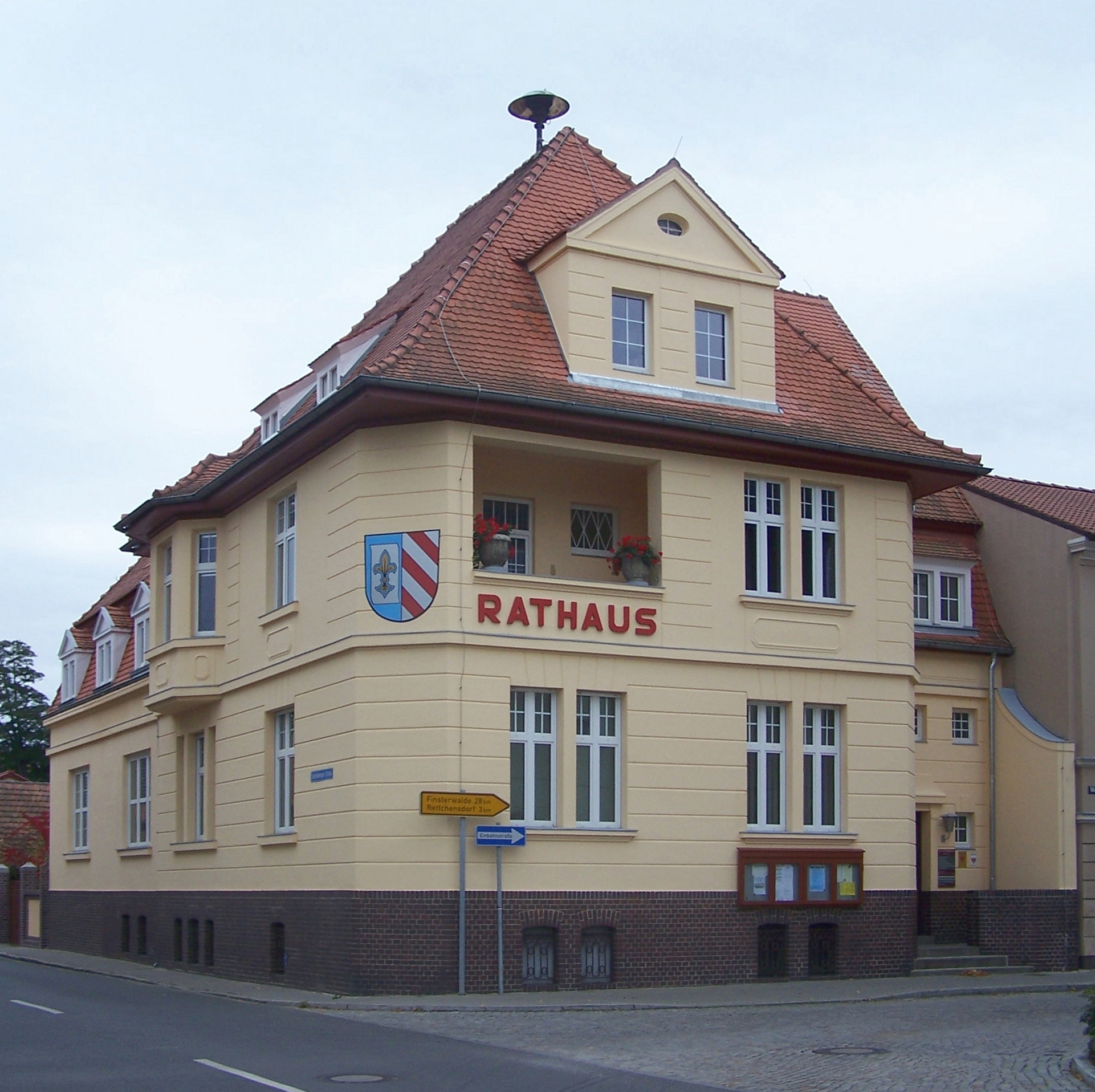
- Municipal administration in Altdöbern

- Coat of arms

- Map of Oberspreewald-Lausitz highlighting Altdöbern
- Interactive map of Altdöbern
- Location within Germany Location within Brandenburg
- Coordinates: 51°39′N 14°02′E
- Country: Germany
- State: Brandenburg
- District: Oberspreewald-Lausitz
- Seat: Altdöbern
- Subdivisions: 5 municipalities

Area
  - Total: 198.79 km^{2} (76.75 sq mi)

Population (2025-12-31)
  - Total: 5,274
  - Density: 26.53/km^{2} (68.71/sq mi)
- Time zone: UTC+01:00 (CET)
  - Summer (DST): UTC+02:00 (CEST)
- Website: www.amt-altdoebern.de

Amt Altdöbern is an Amt ("collective municipality") in the district of Oberspreewald-Lausitz, in Brandenburg, Germany. Its seat is in Altdöbern.

The Amt Altdöbern consists of the following municipalities:

1. Altdöbern
2. Bronkow
3. Luckaitztal
4. Neupetershain
5. Neu-Seeland

== Demography ==
Development of Population since 1875 within the Current Boundaries (Blue Line: Population; Dotted Line: Comparison to Population Development of Brandenburg state; Grey Background: Time of Nazi rule; Red Background: Time of Communist rule)

Recent Population Development and Projections (Population Development before Census 2011 (blue line); Recent Population Development according to the Census in Germany in 2011 (blue bordered line); Official projections for 2005-2030 (yellow line); for 2017-2030 (scarlet line); for 2020-2030 (green line)

Amt Altdöbern: Population development
within the current boundaries (2020)

Year	Pop.	±% p.a.
1875	7,005	—
1890	7,128	+0.12%
1910	10,078	+1.75%
1925	10,181	+0.07%
1939	10,320	+0.10%
1950	12,999	+2.12%
1964	11,627	−0.79%
1971	11,018	−0.77%
1981	9,222	−1.76%

Year	Pop.	±% p.a.
1985	8,794	−1.18%
1990	8,180	−1.44%
1995	8,143	−0.09%
2000	7,920	−0.55%
2005	7,172	−1.96%
2010	6,203	−2.86%
2015	5,789	−1.37%
2020	5,524	−0.93%
2025	5,274	−0.92%
