= Bronkow =

- Municipality
- Location of Bronkow within Oberspreewald-Lausitz district
- Interactive map of Bronkow
- Location within Germany Location within Brandenburg
- Coordinates: 51°40′00″N 13°55′00″E
- Country: Germany
- State: Brandenburg
- District: Oberspreewald-Lausitz
- Municipal assoc.: Altdöbern
- Subdivisions: 2 Ortsteile

Government
  - Mayor (2024–29): Christian Pompsch

Area
  - Total: 38.21 km^{2} (14.75 sq mi)
- Elevation: 129 m (423 ft)

Population (2025-12-31)
  - Total: 526
  - Density: 13.8/km^{2} (35.7/sq mi)
- Time zone: UTC+01:00 (CET)
  - Summer (DST): UTC+02:00 (CEST)
- Postal codes: 03205
- Dialling codes: 035435
- Vehicle registration: OSL
- Website: www.amt-altdoebern.de

Bronkow (German pronunciation: [ˈbʁɔŋko], Lower Sorbian: [ˈbrɔŋkɔw]) is a municipality in the Oberspreewald-Lausitz district, in southern Brandenburg, Germany.

== Geography ==
Bronkow is one of the five municipalities in the Amt of Altdöbern. The municipality includes the districts (German: Ortsteile) of Lipten (Lower Sorbian: Libeśin) and Lug (Ług), as well as the inhabited communities (bewohnte Gemeindeteile) of Rutzkau (Cernjow) and Saadow (Žadow) and the residential areas of Amandusdorf and Forsthaus Lipten.

== History ==
From 1815 to 1945, Bronkow was part of the Prussian Province of Brandenburg.

From 1952 to 1990, it was part of the Bezirk Cottbus of East Germany.

== Demography ==
Development of Population since 1875 within the Current Boundaries (Blue Line: Population; Dotted Line: Comparison to Population Development of Brandenburg state; Grey Background: Time of Nazi rule; Red Background: Time of Communist rule)

Bronkow: Population development
within the current boundaries (2013)

Year	Pop.	±% p.a.
1875	1,092	—
1890	928	−1.08%
1910	1,011	+0.43%
1925	975	−0.24%
1933	968	−0.09%
1939	1,072	+1.72%
1946	1,300	+2.79%
1950	1,288	−0.23%
1964	924	−2.34%
1971	945	+0.32%
1981	796	−1.70%
1985	757	−1.25%
1989	755	−0.07%
1990	764	+1.19%
1991	742	−2.88%
1992	739	−0.40%
1993	739	+0.00%
1994	739	+0.00%
1995	728	−1.49%
1996	728	+0.00%

Year	Pop.	±% p.a.
1997	721	−0.96%
1998	718	−0.42%
1999	720	+0.28%
2000	732	+1.67%
2001	741	+1.23%
2002	723	−2.43%
2003	707	−2.21%
2004	700	−0.99%
2005	692	−1.14%
2006	680	−1.73%
2007	658	−3.24%
2008	652	−0.91%
2009	654	+0.31%
2010	628	−3.98%
2011	638	+1.59%
2012	637	−0.16%
2013	635	−0.31%
2014	610	−3.94%
2015	601	−1.48%
2016	586	−2.50%
