= Luckaitztal =

- Municipality
- Location of Luckaitztal within Oberspreewald-Lausitz district
- Interactive map of Luckaitztal
- Location within Germany Location within Brandenburg
- Coordinates: 51°42′00″N 14°01′00″E
- Country: Germany
- State: Brandenburg
- District: Oberspreewald-Lausitz
- Municipal assoc.: Altdöbern
- Subdivisions: 4 Ortsteile

Government
  - Mayor (2019–24): Roland Schneider

Area
  - Total: 41.72 km^{2} (16.11 sq mi)
- Elevation: 100 m (330 ft)

Population (2025-12-31)
  - Total: 741
  - Density: 17.8/km^{2} (46.0/sq mi)
- Time zone: UTC+01:00 (CET)
  - Summer (DST): UTC+02:00 (CEST)
- Postal codes: 03229
- Dialling codes: 03541
- Vehicle registration: OSL
- Website: www.amt-altdoebern.de

Luckaitztal (Lower Sorbian Lukajca Dolk) is a municipality in the Oberspreewald-Lausitz district, in Lower Lusatia, Brandenburg, Germany.

== History ==
From 1815 to 1947, the constituent localities of Luckaitztal (Buchwäldchen, Muckwar, Gosda and Schöllnitz) were part of the Prussian Province of Brandenburg.

From 1952 to 1990, they were part of the Bezirk Cottbus of East Germany.

On 31 March 2002, the municipality of Luckaitztal was formed by merging the municipalities of Buchwäldchen, Muckwar, Gosda and Schöllnitz.

== Demography ==
Development of Population since 1875 within the Current Boundaries (Blue Line: Population; Dotted Line: Comparison to Population Development of Brandenburg state; Grey Background: Time of Nazi rule; Red Background: Time of Communist rule)

Luckaitztal: Population development
within the current boundaries (2013)

Year	Pop.	±% p.a.
1875	1,257	—
1890	1,126	−0.73%
1910	1,353	+0.92%
1925	1,339	−0.07%
1933	1,250	−0.86%
1939	1,254	+0.05%
1946	1,548	+3.05%
1950	1,611	+1.00%
1964	1,262	−1.73%
1971	1,329	+0.74%
1981	1,150	−1.44%
1985	1,061	−1.99%
1989	965	−2.34%
1990	949	−1.66%
1991	918	−3.27%
1992	897	−2.29%
1993	891	−0.67%
1994	891	+0.00%
1995	903	+1.35%
1996	893	−1.11%

Year	Pop.	±% p.a.
1997	891	−0.22%
1998	918	+3.03%
1999	928	+1.09%
2000	957	+3.12%
2001	948	−0.94%
2002	970	+2.32%
2003	968	−0.21%
2004	969	+0.10%
2005	961	−0.83%
2006	958	−0.31%
2007	936	−2.30%
2008	904	−3.42%
2009	893	−1.22%
2010	875	−2.02%
2011	876	+0.11%
2012	864	−1.37%
2013	848	−1.85%
2014	845	−0.35%
2015	822	−2.72%
2016	811	−1.34%
