= Oberspreewald-Lausitz =

Coordinates: 51°35′N 14°0′E

Oberspreewald-Lausitz Wokrejs Górne Błota-Łužyca Wokrjes Hornje Błóta-Łužica
- District
- Flag Coat of arms
- Country: Germany
- State: Brandenburg
- Capital: Senftenberg

Government
  - District admin.: Siegurd Heinze

Area
  - Total: 1,216.6 km^{2} (469.7 sq mi)

Population (31 December 2025)
  - Total: 106,744
  - Density: 87.740/km^{2} (227.24/sq mi)
- Time zone: UTC+01:00 (CET)
  - Summer (DST): UTC+02:00 (CEST)
- Vehicle registration: OSL, CA, SFB
- Website: www.osl-online.de

Oberspreewald-Lausitz (Lower Sorbian: Wokrejs Górne Błota-Łužyca, Upper Sorbian: Wokrjes Hornje Błóta-Łužica [ˈwɔkʁʲɛs ˈhɔʁnʲɛ ˈbwʊta ˈwuʒitsa]) is a Kreis (district) in the southern part of Brandenburg, Germany. Neighboring districts are (from the north clockwise) Dahme-Spreewald, Spree-Neiße, the districts Bautzen and Meissen in Saxony, and the district Elbe-Elster.

== Geography ==
The Spree river runs through the district; along its banks there is the Spreewald, a wooded area and habitat of several rare animals. The district is part of the historic region of Lusatia.

== History ==
The district was formed in 1993 by merging the previous districts of Calau and Senftenberg and a small part of the district Bad Liebenwerda.

== Demography ==
Development of Population since 1875 within the Current Boundaries (Blue Line: Population; Dotted Line: Comparison to Population Development of Brandenburg state)

Recent Population Development and Projections (Population Development before Census 2011 (blue line); Recent Population Development according to the Census in Germany in 2011 (blue bordered line); Official projections for 2005-2030 (yellow line); for 2014-2030 (red line); for 2017-2030 (scarlet line)

Landkreis Oberspreewald-Lausitz: Population development
within the current boundaries (2025)

Year	Pop.	±% p.a.
1875	58,860	—
1890	69,525	+1.12%
1910	109,357	+2.29%
1925	128,487	+1.08%
1933	133,248	+0.46%
1939	139,774	+0.80%
1946	164,609	+2.36%
1950	165,790	+0.18%
1964	181,923	+0.67%
1971	185,312	+0.26%

Year	Pop.	±% p.a.
1981	175,957	−0.52%
1985	171,995	−0.57%
1990	166,351	−0.67%
1995	156,758	−1.18%
2000	145,110	−1.53%
2005	132,032	−1.87%
2010	121,679	−1.62%
2015	112,450	−1.57%
2020	108,396	−0.73%
2025	106,744	−0.31%

== Coat of arms ==
District banner of Oberspreewald-Lausitz

The coat of arms shows a red bull as the symbol of the Lower Lusatia region, representing the former district Calau. The city wall in the bottom part is an old symbol of the Upper Lusatia region, and also represents the former district Senftenberg. The shield with a lion is the symbol of the county of Meißen, representing the municipalities of the former district Bad Liebenwerda which were included into the district.

== Towns and municipalities ==
Clickable map of towns and municipalities in the district

Amt-free towns	Ämter
1. Calau – Kalawa; 2. Großräschen; 3. Lauchhammer; 4. Lübbenau – Lubnjow; 5. Schwarzheide; 6. Senftenberg; 7. Vetschau – Wětošow; Amt-free municipalities: 1. Schipkau	1. Altdöbern; 1. Altdöbern^{1}; 2. Bronkow; 3. Luckaitztal; 4. Neupetershain; 5. Neu-Seeland; 2. Ortrand; 1. Frauendorf; 2. Großkmehlen; 3. Kroppen; 4. Lindenau; 5. Ortrand^{1, 2}; 6. Tettau	3. Ruhland; 1. Grünewald; 2. Guteborn; 3. Hermsdorf; 4. Hohenbocka; 5. Ruhland^{1, 2}; 6. Schwarzbach
^{1}seat of the Amt; ^{2}town
