= Lindenau, Germany =

Lindenau
- Municipality
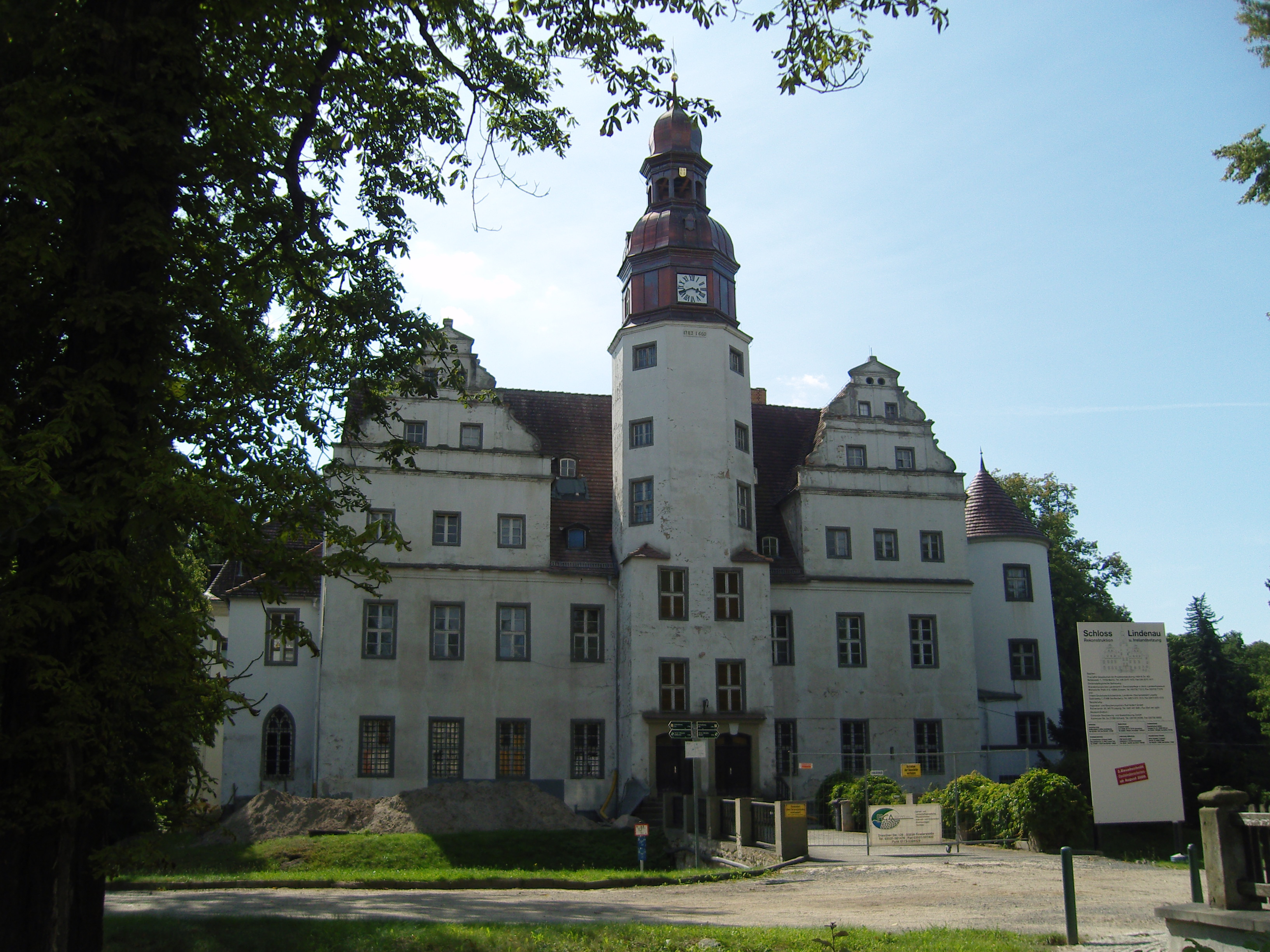
- Lindenau Castle

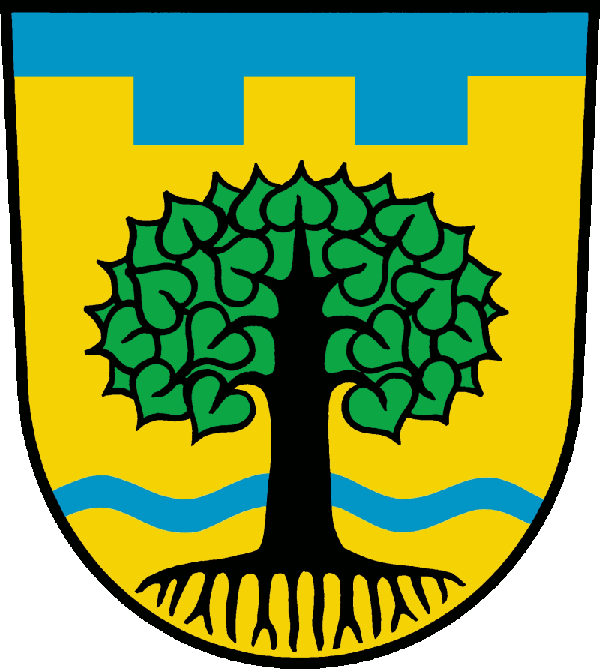
- Coat of arms

- Location of Lindenau within Oberspreewald-Lausitz district
- Interactive map of Lindenau
- Location within Germany Location within Brandenburg
- Coordinates: 51°24′N 13°44′E
- Country: Germany
- State: Brandenburg
- District: Oberspreewald-Lausitz
- Municipal assoc.: Ortrand

Government
  - Mayor (2024–29): Anke Boeltzig

Area
  - Total: 11.17 km^{2} (4.31 sq mi)
- Elevation: 96 m (315 ft)

Population (2025-12-31)
  - Total: 738
  - Density: 66.1/km^{2} (171/sq mi)
- Time zone: UTC+01:00 (CET)
  - Summer (DST): UTC+02:00 (CEST)
- Postal codes: 01945
- Dialling codes: 035755
- Vehicle registration: OSL
- Website: www.lindenau-ol.de

Lindenau (German pronunciation: [ˈlɪndənaʊ]) is a municipality in the Oberspreewald-Lausitz district, in Upper Lusatia, Brandenburg, Germany. Since 1992, it is part of the Amt (municipal confederation) of Ortrand.

Lindenau, located between the rivers Pulsnitz and Schwarze Elster, is the westernmost village of the historic Upper Lusatia region. The Reihendorf arose about 1200 during the reign of King Ottokar I of Bohemia in the course of the German Ostsiedlung in the former Milceni lands, when a motte-and-bailey castle was erected on the border with the Margraviate of Meissen, vis-à-vis the fortress of Großkmehlen. The settlement of Lindenaw was first mentioned in 1342 deed.

Held by the Electorate of Saxony since the 1635 Peace of Prague, Lindenau with northeastern Upper Lusatia passed to the Kingdom of Prussia according to the Final Act of the 1815 Vienna Congress. It was administrated within the Silesia Province (Lower Silesia Province from 1919), again the westernmost village of the province. From 1952 until 1990, it was part of the Bezirk Cottbus of East Germany.

== Demography ==
Development of Population since 1875 within the Current Boundaries (Blue Line: Population; Dotted Line: Comparison to Population Development of Brandenburg state; Grey Background: Time of Nazi rule; Red Background: Time of Communist rule)

Lindenau: Population development
within the current boundaries (2013)

Year	Pop.	±% p.a.
1875	450	—
1890	480	+0.43%
1910	600	+1.12%
1925	663	+0.67%
1933	670	+0.13%
1939	690	+0.49%
1946	867	+3.32%
1950	909	+1.19%
1964	1,015	+0.79%
1971	1,032	+0.24%
1981	876	−1.63%
1985	880	+0.11%
1989	888	+0.23%
1990	887	−0.11%
1991	864	−2.59%
1992	889	+2.89%
1993	895	+0.67%
1994	889	−0.67%
1995	873	−1.80%
1996	853	−2.29%

Year	Pop.	±% p.a.
1997	826	−3.17%
1998	819	−0.85%
1999	816	−0.37%
2000	800	−1.96%
2001	789	−1.38%
2002	792	+0.38%
2003	775	−2.15%
2004	783	+1.03%
2005	773	−1.28%
2006	757	−2.07%
2007	757	+0.00%
2008	752	−0.66%
2009	749	−0.40%
2010	729	−2.67%
2011	709	−2.74%
2012	726	+2.40%
2013	747	+2.89%
2014	740	−0.94%
2015	741	+0.14%
2016	741	+0.00%
