= Primeros =

Oldest registered brand of condoms in Europe

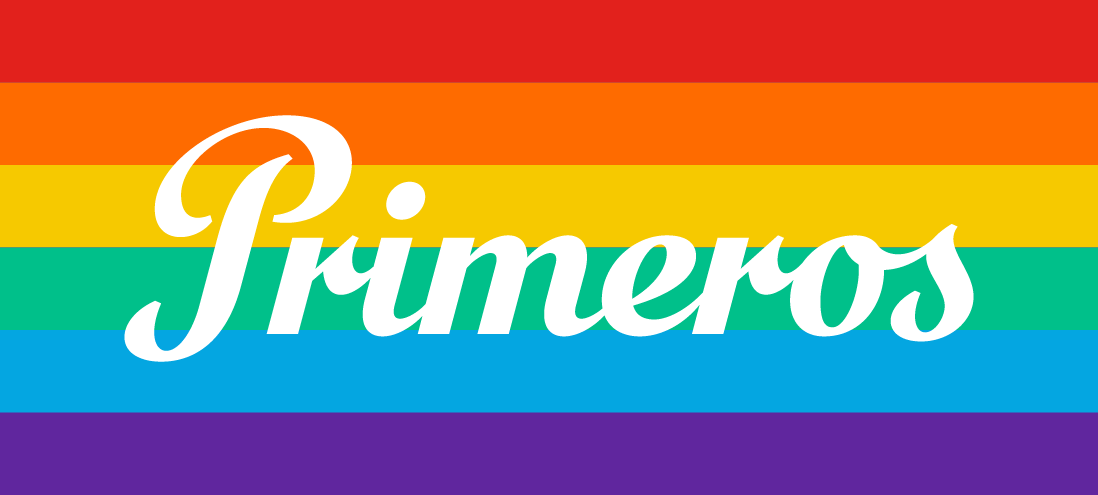
- Founded: 1909
- Founder: Gustav Schwarzwald
- Headquarters: Prague, Czech Republic
- Website: https://www.primeroscondom.com/

Primeros is the oldest registered brand of condoms in Europe. It was founded in Prague, Central Europe in 1909 by the Jewish merchant Gustav Schwarzwald. The graphic concept of Primeros’ packaging, by Czech designers Jakub Korouš, Matěj Chabera and Tomáš Brousil won the Red Dot Europe Design Awards competition. The visual identity of the brand, inspired by the queer community, also received the annual award of the Czech Academy of Design.

== Founders ==
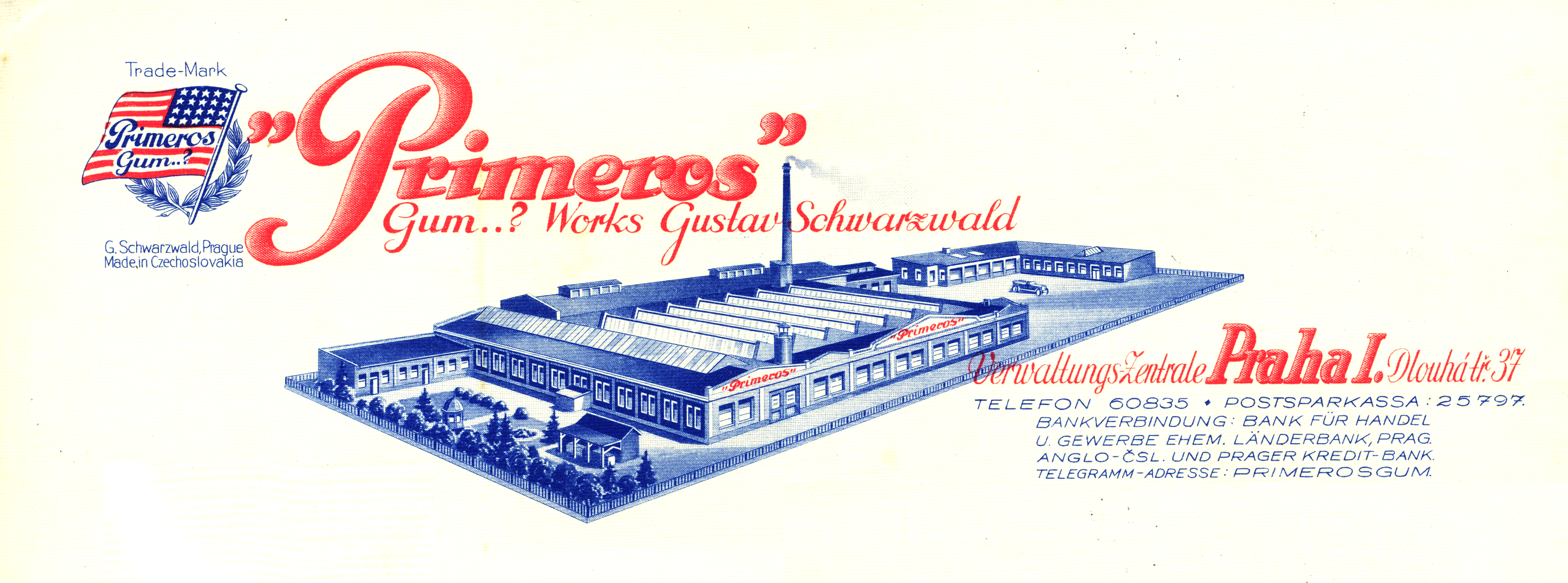
The letterhead of the company Primeros from the 1930s features the contemporary calligraphical logomark of the brand under which the first trademark was registered.

Primeros has officially existed since 1909, when its founder, the Jewish merchant Gustav Schwarzwald, registered a trademark for rubber goods and condoms. The headquarters of the Primeros company was located in the Prague city center in the merchant house "At The Golden Tree". In 1927, Gustav Schwarzwald founded the "Gustav Schwarzwald – Primeros Rubber Goods Factory" in Dresden, respectively, in the nearby town of Ortrand, to facilitate trade relations threatened by the rising economic barriers between Czechoslovakia and Germany. The following year, he transferred his business ownership in Prague to his sister Eleonora Schwarzwald (Löwy or Lowry later in the US).

Gustav Schwarzwald continued to own and keep control of the patent, brand and utility model for Primeros condoms, but due to the deteriorating political situation in Nazi Germany, he was forced to defend his property rights during increasingly frequent anti-Jewish actions. Under the so-called Nuremberg Anti-Jewish Laws, the factory in Dresden (Ortrand) was finally confiscated by the Nazis in 1936. The confiscation was formally justified as the illegal export of intellectual property from Germany to the sister Czechoslovak factory Primeros. After his arrest for alleged tax evasion in 1937, Gustav Schwarzwald wanted to transfer the patent rights of the Primeros brand to the safety of his family, fearing for his life. However, the German authorities repeatedly prevented him from doing so.

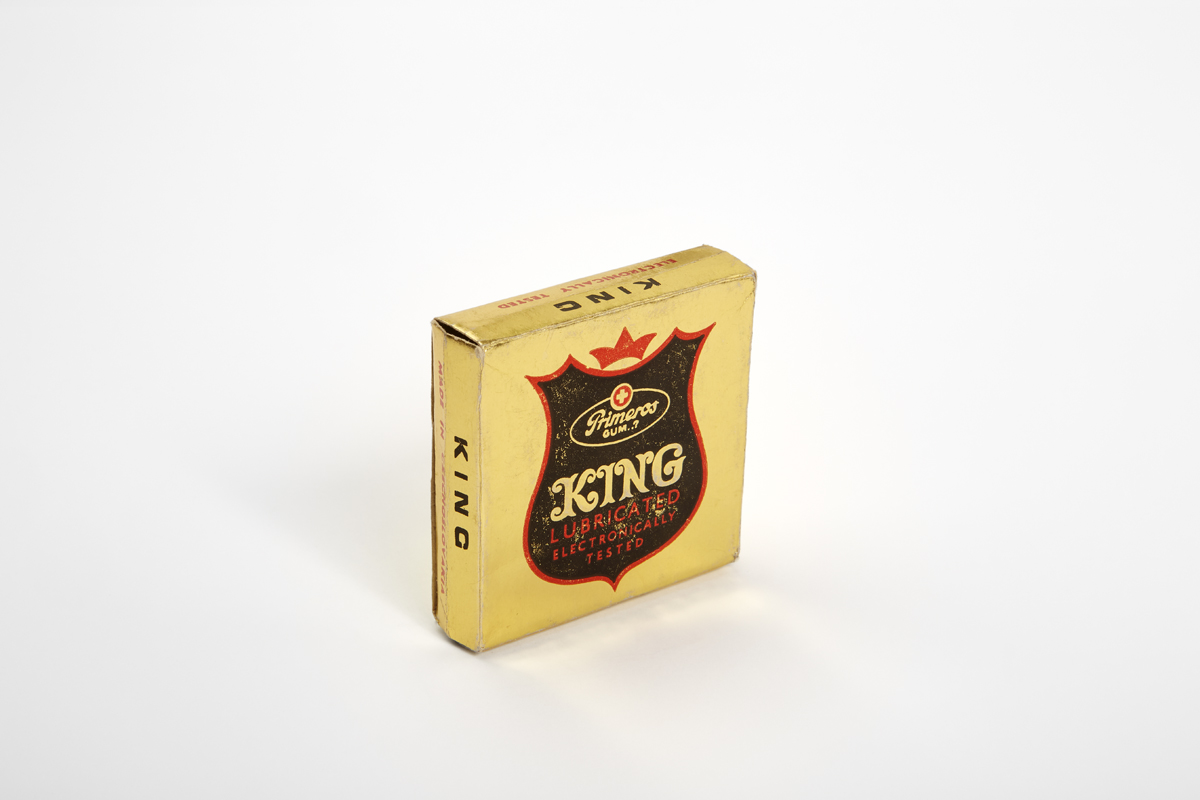
Extra large condoms Primeros KING were one of many innovations of the pre-war condom industry.

His sister Eleonora, meanwhile, expanded her previously acquired business in 1932 by adding a new factory in Děčín on the Czechoslovak border with Nazi Germany (then the Sudetenland), where she produced seamless rubber goods, especially condoms of the then renowned Primeros brand. After the Munich Agreement in 1938, on the basis of which the territory of the Czechoslovak Sudetenland fell to the Nazi German Empire, the factory was also confiscated. In the autumn of 1938, an arrest warrant was issued for Eleonora by the Nazi Gestapo, before which she fled to France, just a few days after the occupation of Czechoslovakia by German troops in March 1939.

Together with her husband and sons Hanuš and Jiří, Eleonora obtained a visa from the Portuguese consul in Bordeaux, Aristides de Sousa Mendes, in June 1940. Through Portugal, she also managed to board an ocean liner to New York, where she arrived in March 1941. According to the American Jewish Joint Distribution Committee, Eleonora's husband, Otto Löwy, tried to help his brother-in-law Gustav Schwarzwald escape from the Nazi regime to America, but to no avail.

Gustav Schwarzwald was eventually murdered for being Jewish on 11 December 1942, in the Nazi extermination camp Auschwitz-Birkenau, near his hometown of Zawiercie (today's Polish Silesia).

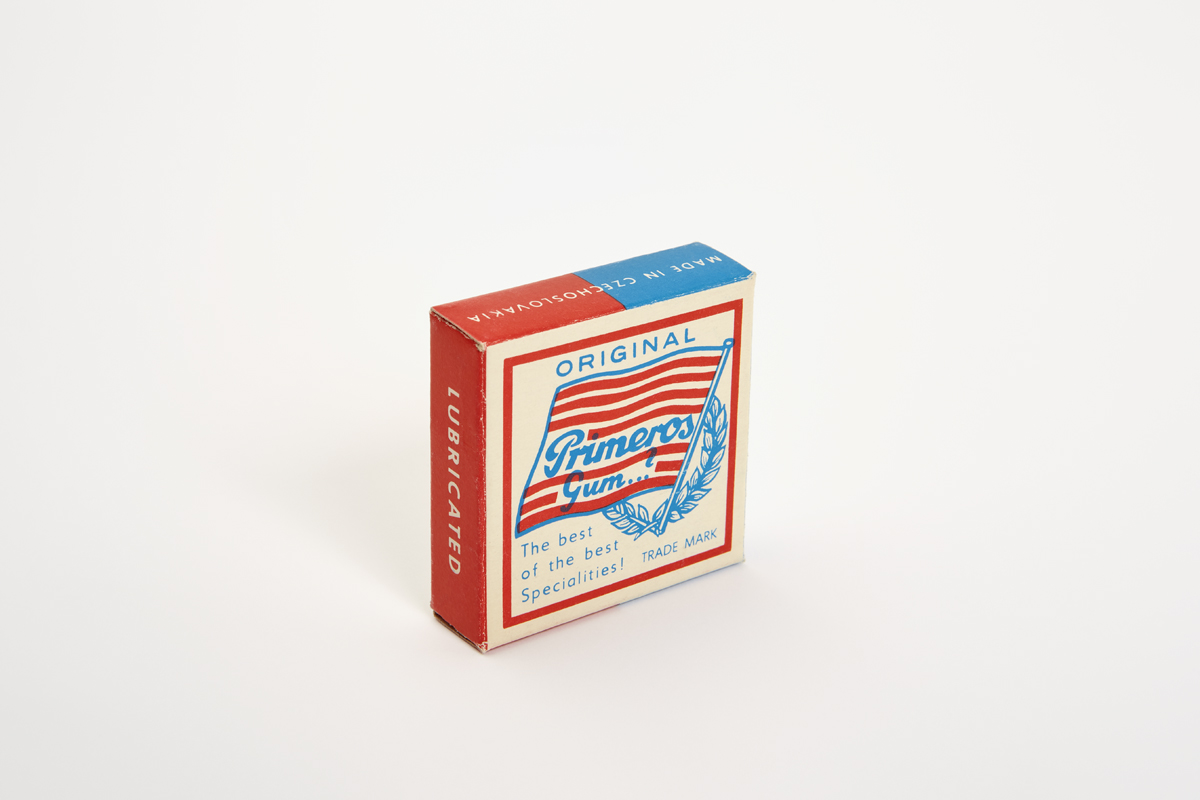
Pre-war design of the Primeros condoms' packaging with the original calligraphic logo on the background of a flag with stripes.

After the occupation of Czechoslovakia and the creation of the Nazi occupation administration of the Protectorate of Bohemia and Moravia in 1939, the Primeros company itself was Aryanized and in 1945 was nationalized on the basis of the Presidential decrees as part of post-war events. After World War II, Eleonora Löwy sought to regain ownership of Primeros. The Czechoslovak authorities unjustly questioned her claims with reference to her alleged German nationality. In communication, Löwy repeatedly demonstrated her loyalty and connection to the Czechoslovak state, and described the persecution by the Nazis that she and her family had faced because of their Jewish origin, as a result of which she was forced to flee the country in 1939. Despite these efforts and irrefutable evidence, all requests for the return of Primeros' property in the 1950s were rejected by the communist authorities and the case was conclusively closed.

== Trademark ==
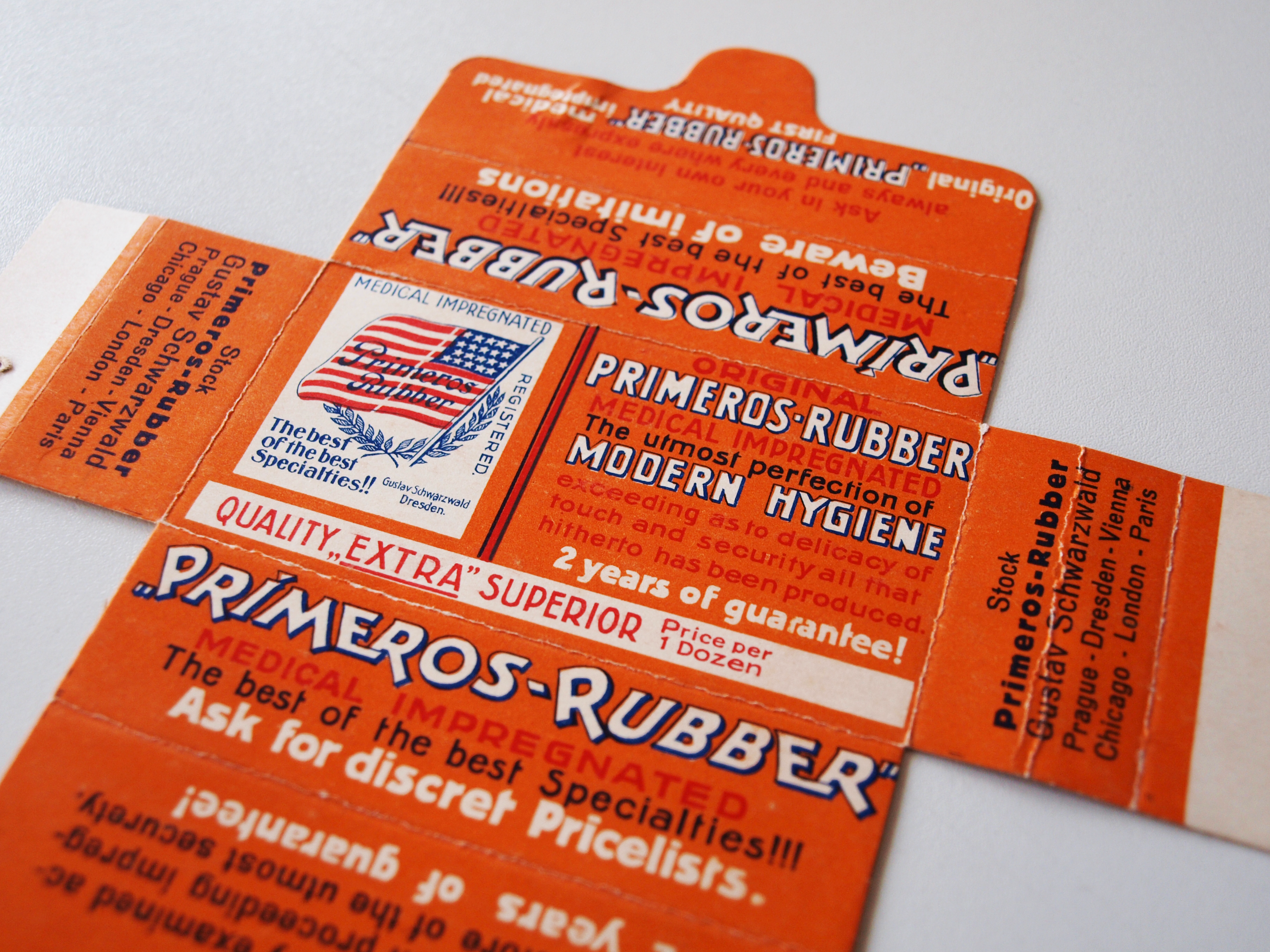
Packaging design of Primeros condoms featuring business representations in Prague, Dresden, Vienna, London, and Chicago, proves international success of the company.

The name Primeros is probably an acronym for the words prim-e (first) and eros (passionate love, romantic love). Eros, from Greek mythology, is the god of love and love itself. Primeros can therefore be translated as "love at first sight" resp. "great love" or "big love". The brand is also listed as PrimEros on some of the company's historical artifacts. Primeros became a household name in the region of Central Europe and also a synonym frequently used for condoms.

The first trademark, which Gustav Schwarzwald registered in 1909, was the calligraphic Primeros logo on the background of a flag with stripes and stars. At first glance, the flag bears a resemblance to the flag of the United States of America. The flag is surrounded by an olive branch and the inscription ‘Gustav Schwarzwald Prag’. The original logo was part of its first condom packaging and was also used in business correspondence until the 1940s. From the 1930s, the company began to use an oval logo with the inscription Primeros and the suffix "GUM ...?". The logo was supplemented by a medical cross, which has become one of the basic identifying symbols of Primeros in its history.

Primeros' headquarters were located in Prague, but thanks to Gustav Schwarzwald's business success, it had substantial presence throughout Europe. It was represented, for example, in Vienna on the main shopping street Mariahilfer Straße, as well as in Warsaw, Budapest, Berlin, Dresden and Bucharest. According to surviving materials, Primeros also had business representations in Paris, London and Chicago. Condoms were most often available in pharmacies and drugstores, which experienced a boom in the early 20th century. The delivery of products for more reserved customers was also a novelty of the time. They could order condoms and other delicate goods, cash on delivery, and receive them in discreet packaging at their home address.

== Period advertising ==
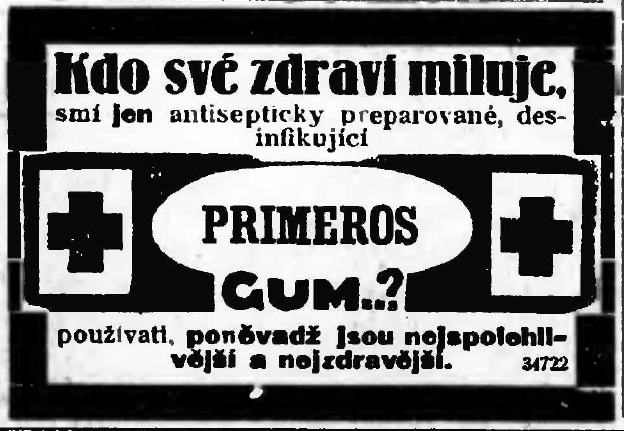
With the beginning of the 20th century, the topic of intimate hygiene and sexual protection became a common part of everyday social life and also subject to promotion in lifestyle magazines.

With the beginning of the 20th century, the topic of intimate hygiene and sexual protection became a common part of everyday social life and also subject to promotion in lifestyle magazines. Advertisements for men's "protective equipment" appeared in daily newspapers and periodicals. This was related not only to societal changes, but also to technological advances, with original reusable rubber condoms being replaced by thinner seamless ones for single and thus more hygienic use.

The condom trade was flourishing in Europe and America between the world wars . It was a modern way of family planning while also protecting against sexually transmitted diseases. The topic of sexuality and contraception ceased to be taboo and specialized shops of modern hygiene were frequently established in towns and city centers.

== Cultural heritage ==
Over the years, the Primeros brand has appeared in literature, film and music. A popular Czech author of the 20th century, Bohumil Hrabal, incorporated Primeros into his books. In the novel I Served the King of England (1971), the piccolo character recalls the visits of the Rubber King, an advertising agent of Primeros: “… The Rubber King, the one who supplied the drugstores with delicate rubber goods, a representative of the Primeros company, who came at any time, so he always had something new… the representative distributed all kinds of condoms, of all colors and shapes… “.

In the 1970s, Primeros became a symbolic instrument of resistance to communist normalization in Czechoslovakia and successfully sabotaged the state pro-population policy enacted by president Husák. The anti-regime underground group The Plastic People of the Universe responded to this as part of a Land art event called "Tribute to Fafejta" in 1972, when they inflated and ritually destroyed 500 Primeros condoms.

Primeros condoms also symbolically played a part in the Oscar-winning film The Shop on Main Street by Ján Kadár and Elmar Klos from 1965, which tells of the persecution of the Jewish population by the Slovak clerical-fascist regime during World War II.

In neither case did Primeros pay for product placement nor advertising.

== Modern history ==
The production of Primeros was completely relocated together with the Vulkan company, the brand of which had already become a part of Primeros during the unstable war times (when the Aryan property machinations took place). Later on, the merger with Veritas and other manufacturers of consumer goods made of rubber from the whole of then socialist Czechoslovakia established a conglomerate of the so-called "Czechoslovak rubber plants".

During the four decades of totalitarian state-controlled economy behind the Iron Curtain, the Primeros brand stagnated or rather declined in importance, and its products were exported only within the countries of the so-called socialist camp. The change in social conditions in the following decade after the Velvet Revolution in 1989 also did not improve the company position on the market, as it was affected by the voucher privatization as well as the competition from the now-available Western brands.

At the beginning of the new millennium, the Primeros brand was taken under control by the Slovak financial group J&T as its first foreign corporate investment in the Czech Republic. In 2005, the German condom manufacturer CPR GmbH and the young financier Roman Kocián became the owners; production then completely moved to Sarstedt, Germany.

In 2016, Kocián approached designers Tomáš Brousil, Jakub Korouš and Matěj Chabera with a communication concept inspired by the Queer community to create a new visual identity for the Primeros brand and packaging expressing Primeros' liberal approach to human sexuality. The designers came up with the proposal of nine different typographic symbols expressing the diversity of sexual personalities and the gender social landscape. The concept also included a calligraphic logo by typographer Tomáš Brousil, referring to the original logotype styling from 1909.

For the graphic design of packaging, Primeros won the international Red Dot Design Award in 2017. The authors also received the annual award of the Academy of Design of the Czech Republic – Czech Grand Design, in the category of Graphic Designer of the Year, 2017.

Primeros currently manufactures its condoms in accordance with the principles of sustainable development in the province of Kedah in northwestern Malaysia, together with its partner Klaus Richter and his boutique condom manufactory Richter Rubber Technology.

Primeros' SEX POSITIVE campaign opposes the stigmatization and categorization of people. The company is a long-term partner and supporter of non-profit organizations of the world movement Pride LGBTQ+.

Other global condom brands later joined Primeros in promoting equal human rights in the area of sexual identity.
