= Pavel Schilling =

Russian military officer and diplomat

Paul Schilling
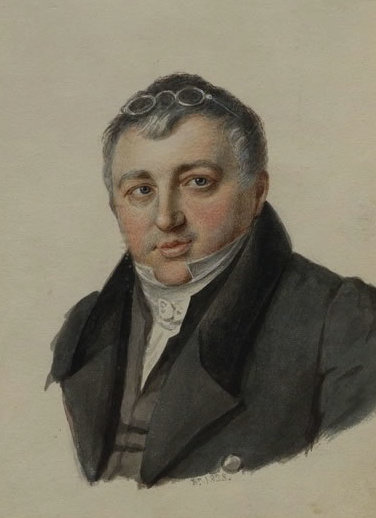
- Portrait by Karl Bryullov, 1828
- Born: April 16, 1786; Tallinn, Russian Empire
- Died: August 6, 1837 (aged 51); Saint Petersburg, Russian Empire
- Occupations: Inventor; military officer; diplomat

Baron Paul Schilling (16 April [O.S. 5 April] 1786 – 6 August [O.S. 25 July] 1837), also known as Pavel Lvovitch Schilling, was a Russian inventor, military officer and diplomat of Baltic German origin. The majority of his career was spent working for the imperial Russian Ministry of Foreign Affairs as a language officer at the Russian embassy in Munich. As a military officer, he took part in the War of the Sixth Coalition against Napoleon. In his later career, he was transferred to the Asian department of the ministry and undertook a tour of Mongolia to collect ancient manuscripts.

Schilling is best known for his pioneering work in electrical telegraphy, which he undertook at his own initiative. While in Munich, he worked with Samuel Thomas von Sömmerring who was developing an electrochemical telegraph. Schilling developed the first electromagnetic telegraph that was of practical use. Schilling's design was a needle telegraph using magnetised needles suspended by a thread over a current-carrying coil. His design also greatly reduced the number of wires compared to Sömmerring's system by the use of binary coding. Tsar Nicholas I planned to install Schilling's telegraph on a link to Kronstadt, but cancelled the project after Schilling died.

Other technological interests of Schilling included lithography and remote detonation of explosives. For the latter, he invented a submarine cable, which he later also applied to telegraphy. Work on telegraphy in Russia, and other electrical applications, was continued after Schilling's death by Moritz von Jacobi, his assistant and successor as head of the St. Petersburg electrical engineering workshop.

== Biography ==
=== Early life ===
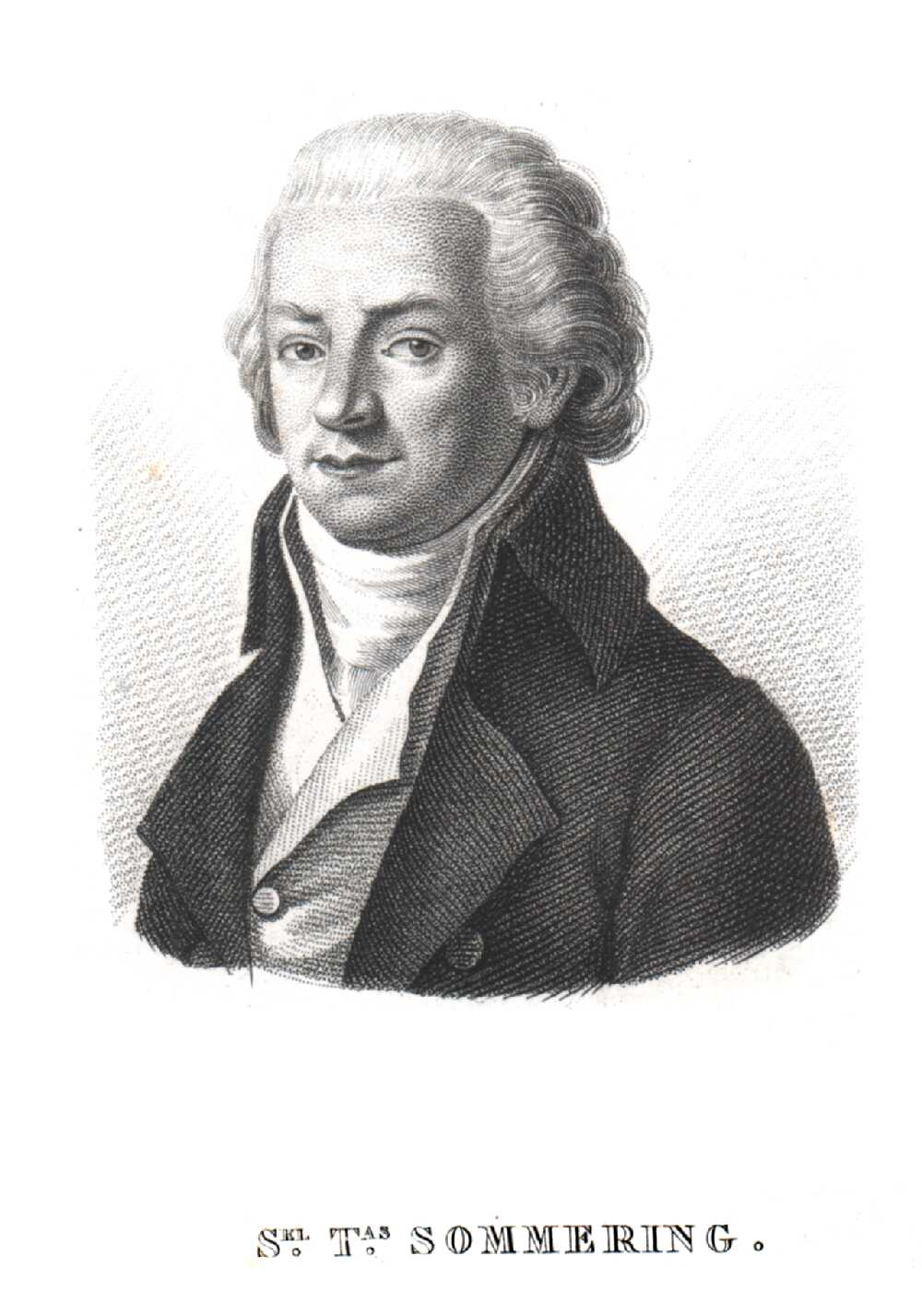
Samuel Thomas von Sömmerring

Baron Pavel Lvovitch Schilling von Cannstadt was born in Reval (now Tallinn), Estonia, on 16 April 1786 (N.S.). He was an ethnic German of Swabian and Baltic descent. Soon after the birth of Pavel, their first child, Ludwig von Schilling was promoted to the commander of the 23rd Nizovsky infantry regiment, and the family relocated to Kazan where the regiment was based. Pavel spent his childhood years in Kazan; early exposure to diverse Asiatic cultures explains his lasting interest in the Orient. He was expected to follow a military career like his father, so at the age of nine he was formally enrolled at the Nizovsky regiment, and two years later, after his father's death, he was sent to the First Cadet Corps. By this time, tsar Paul's haphazard management had reduced military education to mere exhibition drill; Schilling's proper training commenced only after graduation, in 1802. He was commissioned as a podporuchik, posted to the Quartermaster general's office commanded by Theodor von Schubert and assigned cartographical surveying duties.

Family circumstances obliged Schilling to resign his commission in 1803. He then joined the foreign service as a language officer, and dispatched to the Russian legation in Munich, where his stepfather Karl von Bühler was the minister. After Bühler's retirement, Schilling served as an attaché to the legation in Munich from 1809 to 1811. He first became interested in electrical science while he was in Munich through contact with Samuel Thomas von Sömmerring who was developing an electrical telegraph. Since his duties as a diplomat were light, he spent much time with Sömmerring, and brought many Russian dignitaries to see Sömmerring's apparatus.

=== Napoleonic wars ===
When war threatened between France and Russia, Schilling put his mind to applying his electrical knowledge to military purposes. In July 1812 he, along with all Russian diplomats in Germany, was recalled to Saint Petersburg in anticipation of the impending French invasion of Russia. He brought with him a complete set of Sömmerring's telegraph, and demonstrated it to military engineers and tsar Alexander. He continued work on remote mine detonation. However, none of his inventions were ready for field service, and Schilling requested transfer to a military position in the fighting Army.

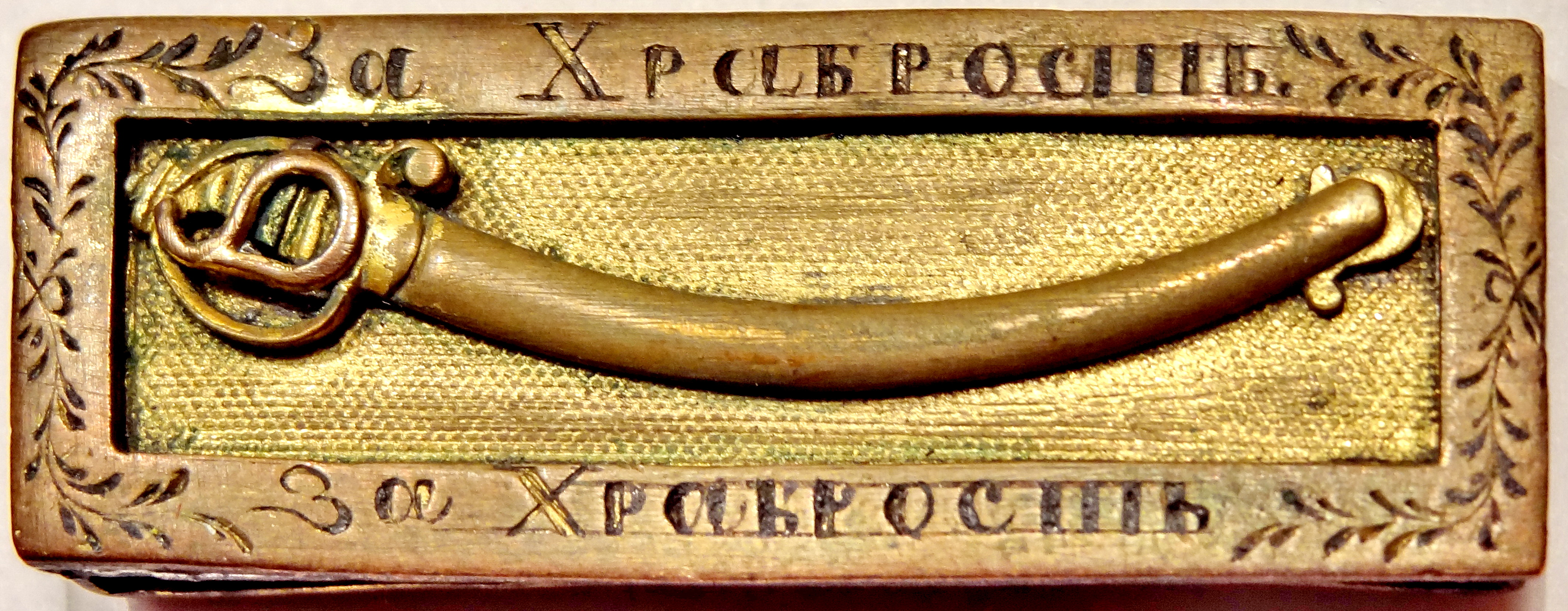
Badge of the Golden Weapon for Bravery worn with civil suit

Placing him into the military structure was not easy. Schilling did not have any combat experience. As a retired Army officer, he was merely a second lieutenant (podporuchik); as a civil servant, he has reached a rank equivalent to Army major. The situation was not uncommon for the volunteers of 1812, yet it had puzzled military authorities and Schilling's application was rejected. In May 1813 he appealed directly to Alexander I, who authorised placing Schilling to horse artillery reserves; on 6 September [O.S. 25 August] 1813 he was posted to commander Alexander Seslavin's Sumy hussars with the rank of Shtabs-rotmistr (i.e. Captain Lieutenant) (Note: Hamel gives the rank as Stabsrittmeister, German for staff captain or captain lieutenant. Hamel describes Schilling's regiment as the Secumsky regiment of Hussars, but this may just be a variant translation rather than a different regiment (Hamel, p. 22).) Schilling arrived at the regiment shortly after the Battle of Dresden. He was initially employed as a liaison with Saxon authorities, and had not seen real combat until December 1813, when Russian troops advanced into French territory. He received his first combat award for the Battle of Bar-sur-Aube of 27 February 1814; his actions during the Battle of Arcis-sur-Aube and the Battle of Fère-Champenoise were rewarded with the Golden Weapon for Bravery.

=== Return to foreign service ===
After the fall of Paris Schilling requested transfer from the Army back to civil service, and in October of the same year he returned to Foreign Affairs in Saint Petersburg. Russian foreign policy of the immediate post-war period concentrated on eastward expansion, thus Schilling was placed with the growing Asiatic Department. He continued to take an interest in electricity and lithography, a new method of printing which he wished to introduce into Russia. His presentation of the latest German lithographic printing technology aroused interest in the Ministry, and very soon he was dispatched back to Bavaria, with instructions to secure supplies of lithographic stone from the Solnhofen quarries. In July 1815 he arrived in Munich to meet with Alois Senefelder, the inventor of the lithographic process, who assisted Schilling with his errand; in December Schilling briefly visited Bavaria again, to take delivery of finished stones. During 1815 he met many French and German orientalists and physicists, particularly André-Marie Ampère, François Arago and Johann Schweigger.

On his return to Saint Petersburg, Schilling was appointed head of the Ministry's lithographic print shop, which was established in the spring of 1816. Curiously, the first document printed there was an erotic poem by Vasily Pushkin, the only Russian verse that Schilling could recite by heart. Setting up the print shop was rewarded with the Order of Saint Anna. Apart from disseminating reports, maps and instructions within the foreign service, Schilling's shop also produced daily summaries of intercepted letters and other covert surveillance. These were delivered to foreign minister Karl Nesselrode, and then, at the minister's discretion, to the tsar. Not later than 1818 Schilling began experiments with Manchu and Mongolian typography; from 1820 he assisted father Peter Kamensky in preparation of the Chinese-Mongolian-Manchu-Russian-Latin dictionary. His Chinese editions had exemplary quality for the time, on a par with the Peking Palace originals.

Schilling retained control of the print shop until the end of his life, however, this was only one of his side activities. His main responsibilities at the foreign service were development, distribution and safeguarding of ciphers for Russian embassies and overseas agents. After the 1823 service reform Schilling was appointed head of the 2nd Secret Branch, and held this post until his death. The secretive nature of this work remained classified throughout the 19th and 20th centuries, and escaped notice by contemporaries and biographers. (Note: The definitive Russian-language biography by Anatoly Yarotsky, printed in 1963, completely omits the subject.) Friends and correspondents knew that he was a middle-level servant in the foreign service, but nothing more. Schilling was not engaged in diplomacy, but was perceived as a diplomat; the deception was supported by the facts that he often travelled abroad and met foreign dignitaries without apparent restrictions. Secrecy was compensated with generous payouts, for example in 1830 Nicholas I authorised a bonus payment of 1000 golden ducats; (Note: Not genuine European ducats, but forged Russian copies of the Utrecht ducat, secretly minted for Russian diplomats and troops overseas. Although technically a forgery, the coins were made of real fine gold.) Schilling's subordinates received lesser, but still substantial rewards.

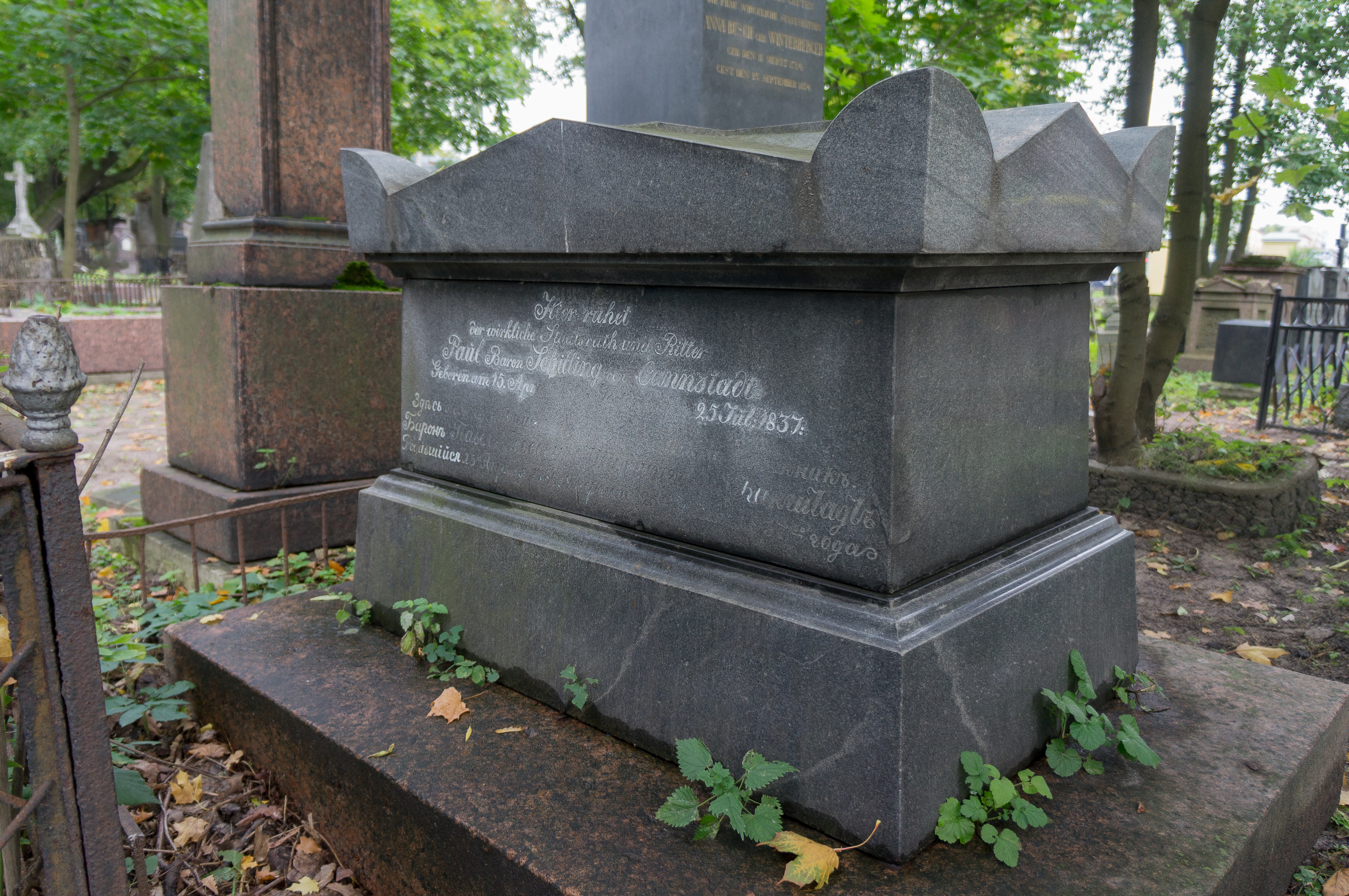
Schilling's tomb at Smolenskoye Lutheran Cemetery

Work at the Cipher Branch left plenty of time for unrelated research, from studying Tibetan scriptures to developing electrical telegraph, which became Schilling's best known work. Schilling set up an electrical engineering workshop in the Peter and Paul Fortress, and recruited Moritz von Jacobi from Dorpat University to act as his assistant there. In 1828 Schilling was made a State Councillor and became a corresponding member of the Institute of Oriental Studies of the Russian Academy of Sciences. In May 1830, he was sent on a two-year reconnaissance mission to the Russo-Chinese frontier. He returned to St. Petersburg in March 1832, bringing with him a valuable collection of documents in Chinese, Tibetan, Mongolian and other languages. These were deposited in the Imperial Academy of Sciences in St. Petersburg. Some of these documents were obtained in exchange for a demonstration of the small telegraph apparatus Schilling had carried with him. Back in St. Petersburg, Schilling returned to developing a telegraph. There were plans to put it into service, but Schilling died before these could be completed.

=== Decline and death ===
Schilling's state of health deteriorated through the 1830s. He was morbidly obese, and by 1835 suffered pains of unknown nature. He requested permission to travel to Europe for medical help, and with the help of Nesselrode secured the tsar's written consent that was actually an order for an industrial espionage mission, in areas from telegraphy to charcoal kilns. In September 1835 Schilling attended a conference in Bonn, as instructed by Nicholas I, and delivered his telegraph set to Georg Wilhelm Muncke. Upon return to Saint Petersburg, he conducted further experiments in telegraphy. In 1836 he briefly appeared at Andreas von Ettingshausen's laboratory in Vienna, researching new insulation materials. In May 1837 Schilling received instructions to draw a budget for a telegraph line connecting Peterhof with Kronstadt, and to begin preliminary field work. By this time he experienced regular pain caused by a tumour. Doctor Nicholas Arendt, his childhood friend from Kazan years, now Life Medic to the tsar, performed a surgery that did not help. Schilling died a few months later, and was buried with honours at the Smolenskoye Lutheran Cemetery in Saint Petersburg. All records, models and equipment left by Schilling passed to Moritz von Jacobi, who would build the first operational telegraph line in Russia, connecting the Winter Palace with the Army Headquarters, in 1841.

== Works ==
=== Cryptography ===
Schilling's main contribution to cryptography was his bigram cipher, adopted for government use in 1823. The Schilling ciphers combined features of substitution ciphers and multiple-choice polyalphabetic ciphers using bigrams as source input. Each bigram consisted of two letters of source plaintext (in French language, the lingua franca of diplomacy), separated with a predetermined number of characters. The bigram was then converted to a number using permanent codetables containing 992 (32x31) pairs of alternative numbers. The method also involved padding source plaintext with random garbage and occasional encoding of single characters instead of bigrams.

The first three sets of codetables prepared by Schilling were issued to viceroy of Poland Grand Duke Konstantin, special envoy to Persia prince Alexander Menshikov, and to foreign minister Karl Nesselrode on his journey to the United States. The method was used by Russian diplomats until the 1900s. Individual ciphers were rated safe for up to six years of service, later downrated to three years; in reality, some codetables remained in use for up to twenty years, violating all security protocols.

=== Oriental expedition ===
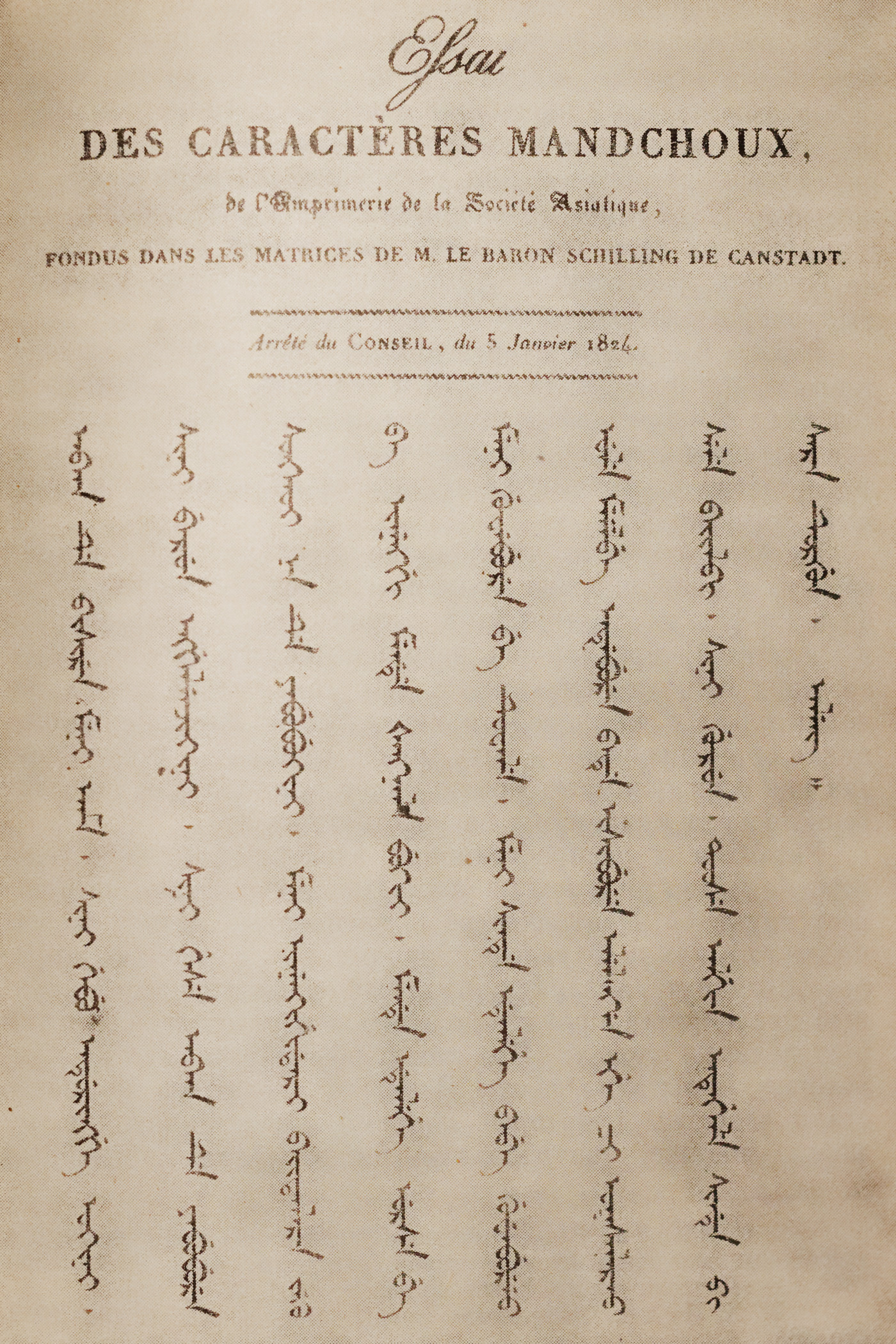
The Manchurian alphabet, printed with Schilling's lead sorts, 1824

In the 1820s Schilling's scholarly papers on oriental languages brought him degrees and membership in British, French and Russian learned societies. He was a long-time friend to the chief of the Russian Orthodox mission in Peking, and leading Russian orientalist Nikita Bichurin (father Hyacinth). After Bichurin was disgracefully demoted and exiled, Schilling advocated for his pardon, and in 1826 he secured the transfer of Bichurin from imprisonment at Valaam Monastery to a desk job at the Foreign Ministry in Saint Petersburg. Schilling assisted Alexander von Humboldt during the initial stages of the 1829 expedition to Russia. After Humboldt had declined an offer to lead another expedition into the Russian Far East, the role was awarded to Schilling. Preparations began immediately after signing of the Treaty of Adrianople in September 1829. Core staff of the expedition included Schilling himself, Bichurin and Vladimir Solomirsky, bastard son of Dmitry Tatishchev. Alexander Pushkin, well acquainted to all three, wanted to join, but Nicholas I ordered him to stay in Russia. (Note: Nicholas I, self-proclaimed guardian of Pushkin, was worried about the latter's impending bankruptcy. While the tsar could not control the poet's spendings directly, he could prevent him from costly travels (Yarotsky 1963, p. 44))

Schilling's main, covert mission was to evaluate the spread of Buddhism among local tribes, to outline the course of action to contain it, and to compile a binding statute that would regulate all aspects of Buddhist religious practice. The imperial government did not tolerate any independent ideologies and settled on subjugating the Buddhist leaders to the state. Meanwhile, the number of Buddhist monks was increasing at pace, almost doubling over a decade. (Note: "In 1822 there were already 2,502 monks, and nine years later this figure had grown to 4,637. The growth of the Buddhist clergy caused anxiety to the local authorities" (Uspensky 2010, p. 429)) Outright repressions were ruled out, for fears of mass emigration of nomads, and of potential conflict with China. The government was also concerned with the decline of border trade at the Kyakhta checkpoint and the increase in smuggling; Schilling was tasked with identifying the routes and the markets used by smugglers and to evaluate the volume of illegal trade. Officially, the mission was limited to "studies of population and international trade on the Russo-Chinese frontier"; any research apart from these tasks had to be paid by Schilling personally. To raise money, Schilling sold his scientific library to the Ministry of Education.

In May 1830 Schilling began the journey from Saint Petersburg to Kyakhta, a frontier market town that became his base for the next 18 months. His travels out of Kyakhta to various Buddhist shrines and border stations amounted, in total, to 7208 versts (7690 kilometres). Schilling himself wrote that the purpose of these travels was primarily ethnographic research. According to Bichurin, Schilling spent most of his time with Tibetan and Mongolian lamas, studying ancient Buddhist scriptures; he was concerned more with linguistics and history of Far Eastern peoples, rather than ethnography. His main quest was the search for the Kangyur - a Tibetan religious text closely guarded by the lamas and known to Europeans only in fragments. (Note: The first fragments were discovered by Russian military in Ablay-Hit, in present-day Kazakhstan, in 1721 and printed in Leipzig in 1722. However, the contents of the book remained a matter of debate until the 1830s, when Sándor Kőrösi Csoma, Schilling and others managed to obtain their own copies (Zorin, p. 11)) At the beginning, Schilling tried to obtain the complete Kangyur from China. He could not imagine that poor nomadic Buryats and Mongols could create, own and safeguard whole libraries of sacred literature. However, he soon found out that the Buryats of the Russian Empire owned three copies of three different editions of the Kangyur; one of the three was preserved in Chikoy, less than twenty miles east from Kyakhta. Schilling earned the respect of the lamas for being the only Russian who could read Tibetan texts, and easily obtained permission to read and copy them. According to Leonid Chuguevsky, (Note: Leonid Chuguevsky (1926-2000) was an ethnic Russian sinologist and archivist born and raised in Manchuria. In 1954, after teaching at various colleges in communist China, he repatriated to the Soviet Union and worked as a researcher at the Oriental Archive of the Academy of Sciences in Saint Petersburg. His most important work was sorting, indexing and publishing the Dunhuang manuscripts from the Oriental Archive. Chuguevsky compiled the catalogue of Schilling's legacy, and published a detailed review of Schilling's mission to Kyakhta .) it is likely that the lamas were aware of Schilling's mission and his liberal view towards state control over religion, and in their own way tried to appease the friendly but dangerous visitor.

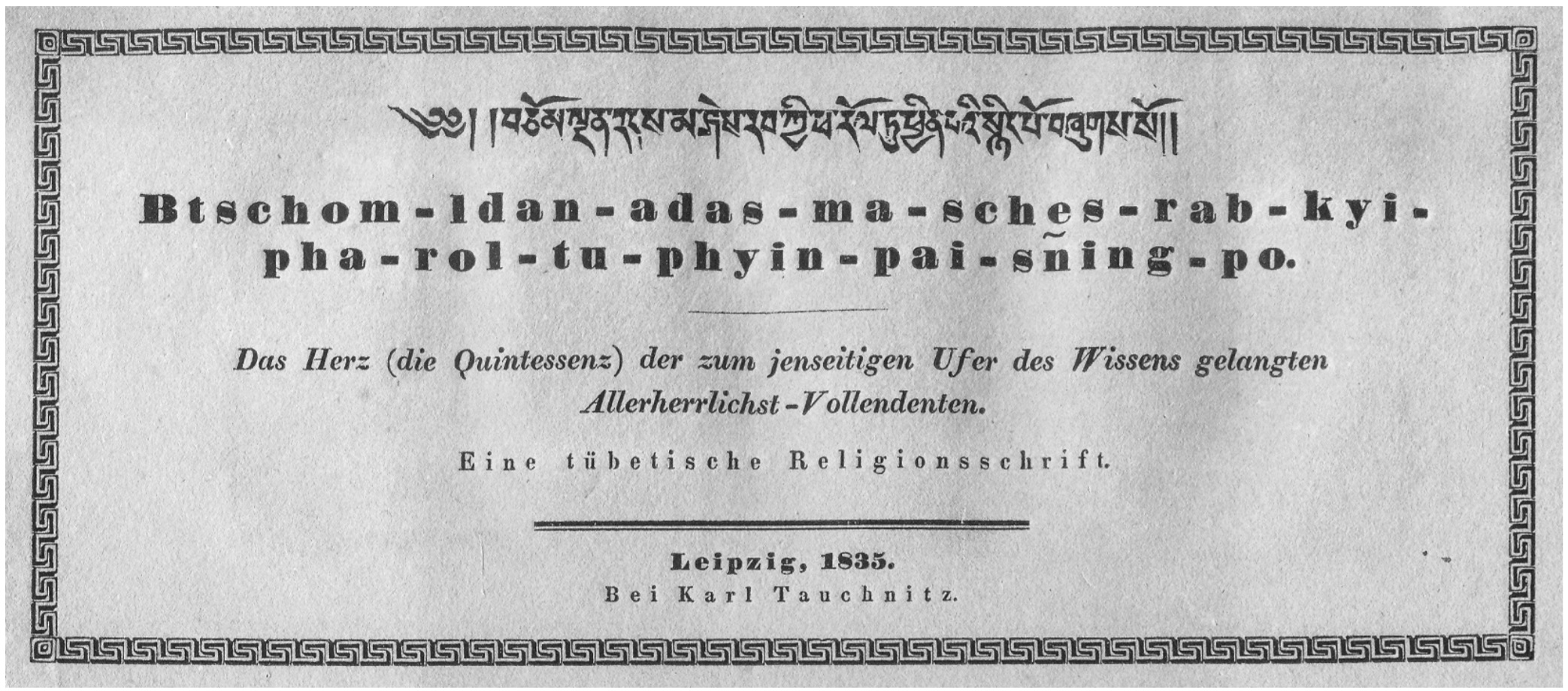
The Tibetan Prayerbook prepared for publication by Schilling. Leipzig, 1835

The Chikoy Kangyur could only be copied, but Schilling managed to acquire parts of a different copy from the chief of the Tsongol tribe. Later the Khambo Lama of the Buryats sent Schilling a collection of medical and astrological treatises. Schilling became a celebrity among the Buryats: some lamas preached that he was the prophet that would convert the Europeans, others believed that he was the reincarnated Khubilgan. His house in Kyakhta became the object of mass pilgrimage that brought more and more manuscripts. Schilling realised that, apart from the complete Kangyur, his collection missed only a few essential texts of the Tibetan Buddhist canon. He filled the gaps by hiring more than twenty calligraphists who copied the missing books. Józef Kowalewski, who witnessed the process, wrote that "the Baron", although an amateur, "influenced the Buriats immensely ... There appeared experts in the Tibetan and even in Sanskrit languages, painters, engravers; the monks began to inquire more deeply into the foundations of their faith and to read books; there were discovered many books which had been before claimed as being non-extant".

Finally, in March 1831 Schilling obtained the Kangyur and the 224-volume Tengyur at a remote datsan on the Onon River. Local lamas struggled to print 100 million copies (Note: 100 million copies = 400 thousand sheets, each containing 250 tiny mantras. Schilling could provide even higher density, and print sheets much faster (Uspensky, p. 294)) of Om mani padme hum that they once vowed to contribute to a new shrine, and Schilling came to the rescue promising to print the whole lot, in tiny lithographed Tibetan script, in Saint Petersburg. He fulfilled the promise, and was rewarded with the precious books. This Derge edition of the Kangyur, which Schilling mistook for the older, classic Narthang version, was the first Kangyur owned by a European. (Note: The first Kangyur in possession of European scientific institutions, open for public research, was the Narthang Kangyur purchased by the Royal Library in Paris in 1840. Schilling's Kangyur was deposited at the Russian Academy library three years later (Zorin, p. 11)) Once the collection was complete, Schilling began cataloguing and indexing; his Index of the Narthang Kangyur, printed posthumously and anonymously in 1845, contains 3800 pages in four volumes.

Schilling returned to Moscow in March 1832, and one month later arrived in Saint Petersburg with reports and drafts of statutes on cross-border trade and on Buddhist clergy. He recommended keeping the status quo on both issues, while keeping an eye on similar problems of the British administrators in Canton. The government decided not to press the issue of religion; a statute regulating the Buddhists was enacted only in 1853. Having fulfilled the mission, Schilling concentrated on telegraphy and cryptography. His work on the Kangyur was completed by an educated lay Buryat man brought from Siberia specifically for this purpose.

=== Telegraphy ===
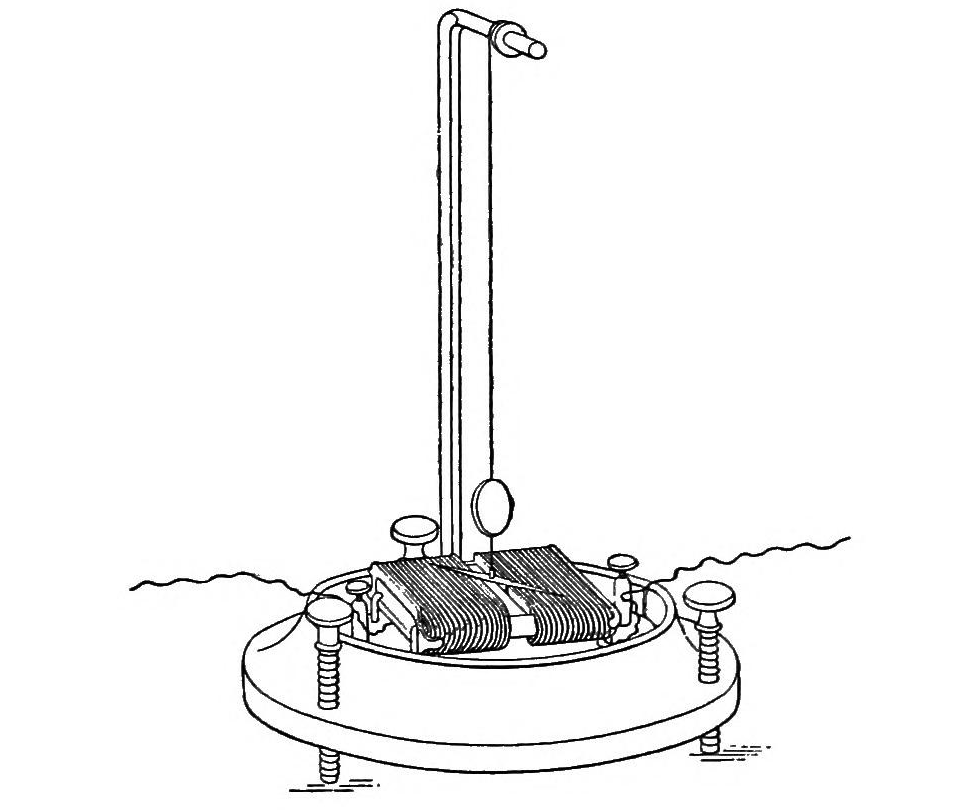
A needle instrument from Schilling's telegraph, 1828. Overall height of the enclosure was around 300 mm, the magnetic needle is 57 mm long

Schilling first became involved in telegraphy while he was in Munich. He assisted Sömmerring with his experiments with an electrochemical telegraph. This form of telegraph uses electricity to cause a chemical reaction at the far end, such as bubbles forming in a glass tube of acid. After returning to St. Petersburg he conducted his own experiments with this type of telegraph. He demonstrated this to Tsar Alexander I in 1812, but Alexander declined to take it up. His successor Nicholas I (ascended 1825), wary about the spread of "subversive" ideas, was particularly opposed to introducing any mass communications. He agreed with the use of electrical telegraphy for selected military and civil offices, but prohibited public discussion of telegraph technology, including even reports on foreign inventions. Schilling could demonstrate his experiments to the public with no ill consequences, but he never tried to publish his research in print. After the death of Schilling, in 1841, Moritz von Jacobi tried to do it, and the journal containing his review article was confiscated and destroyed by a special order of the tsar. When Schilling learned of Hans Christian Ørsted's discovery in 1820 that electric current could deflect compass needles, he decided to switch investigation into needle telegraphs, that is, telegraphs that used Ørsted's principle. Schilling used from one to six needles in various demonstrations to represent letters of the alphabet or other information.

==== 1828 prototype ====
The first Schilling telegraph was completed in 1828. The demonstration set consisted of a double-wire copper line and two terminals, each having a voltaic pile providing current of around 200 mA, a Schweigger multiplier for indication, a send-receive switch and a bidirectional telegraph key. There were no intermediate repeaters yet, limiting the potential range of the system. The switches and the keys used open vials filled with mercury. Likewise, the shaft of the multiplier pointer was hydraulically dampened by suspending its paddle in a pool of mercury. The coil of each multiplier contained 1760 turns of copper wire insulated with silk. Two magnetized steel pegs ensured that in absence of current the pointer always returned to its off-state, and provided some additional dampening.

The 40-character code table used variable-length coding, from one to five bits per character. Unlike the dot-dash bits of the Morse code, the bits of Schilling telegraph were encoded by current direction, and marked as either "left" or "right" in the codetable. The economic value of variable-length coding was not obvious yet; relying on operator's memory or scratchpads to record incoming bits was deemed too unreliable. Thus, fellow researchers compelled Schilling to design an alternative multi-wire, parallel-send system. Von Sömmerring used eight bits; Schilling reduced the number of bits to six (again, for a 40-character alphabet).

Schilling took a single-needle instrument with him for demonstration purposes on his journey to the Far East. When he returned, Schilling used a binary code on his telegraph with multiple needles, inspired by the hexagrams from I Ching which he had become familiar with in the East. These hexagrams are figures used in divination, each of which consist of a figure of six stacked lines. Each line can be solid or broken, two binary states, leading to a total of 64 figures. The six units of the I Ching fitted in perfectly with the six needles he needed to code the Russian alphabet. This was the first use of binary coding in telecommunications, predating the Baudot code by several decades.

==== 1832 demonstration ====
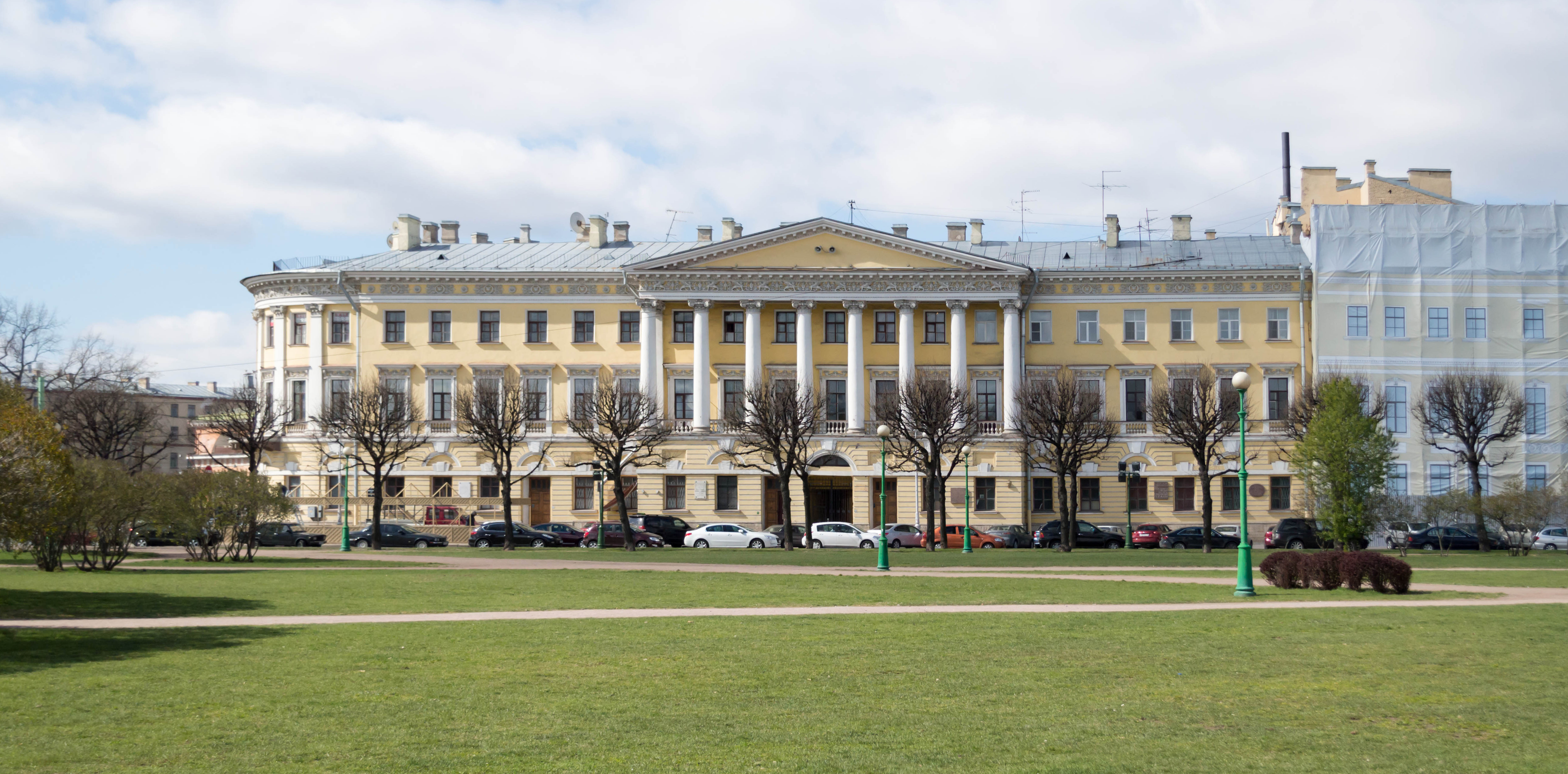
The Adamini Building, where Schilling lived from 1832, was large enough to house a hundred-meter telegraph line

On 21 October 1832 (O.S.), Schilling set up a demonstration of his six-needle telegraph between two rooms in his apartment building at Marsovo Pole, about 100 metres apart. (Note: Sources disagree over whether the 1832 demonstration had six signal needles or one. A one-needle telegraph could replace a six-needle telegraph by sending the digits of the code serially instead of in parallel. Examples of Schilling's six-needle telegraph are in museums in Munich and St. Petersburg, but these are likely not originals. They appear to have been built much later (in the 1880s) for display at exhibitions (Hubbard, p. 13).) To get the space to demonstrate a credible distance, he hired the entire floor of the building and ran a mile and a half of wire around the building. The demonstration was so popular that it stayed open until the Christmas break. Notable visitors included Nicholas I (who had already seen an earlier version in April 1830), Moritz von Jacobi, Alexander von Benckendorff, and Grand Duke Michael Pavlovich. A ten-word message in French was dictated by the Tsar and successfully sent over the apparatus. (Note: Some sources (Hubbard, p. 13, Dudley, p. 103) place the demonstration to the Tsar in Berlin. This seems less likely and may be an error. If it was not, there must have been two demonstrations.) Alexander von Humboldt, after seeing Schilling's telegraph demonstrated in Berlin, recommended to the Tsar that a telegraph should be built in Russia.

In May 1835, Schilling began a tour of Europe demonstrating a one-needle instrument. He conducted experiments in Vienna with other scientists, including an investigation into the relative merits of rooftop and buried cables. The buried cable was not successful because his thin India rubber and varnish insulation was inadequate. In September he was at a meeting in Bonn where Georg Wilhelm Muncke saw the instrument. Muncke had a copy made for use in his lectures. In 1835, Schilling demonstrated a five-needle telegraph to the German Physical Society in Frankfurt. By the time Schilling returned to Russia, his telegraph was well known throughout Europe and was frequently discussed in the scientific literature. In September 1836, the British government offered to buy the rights to the telegraph but Schilling declined, wishing to use it to pursue telegraphy in Russia.

==== Planned installation ====
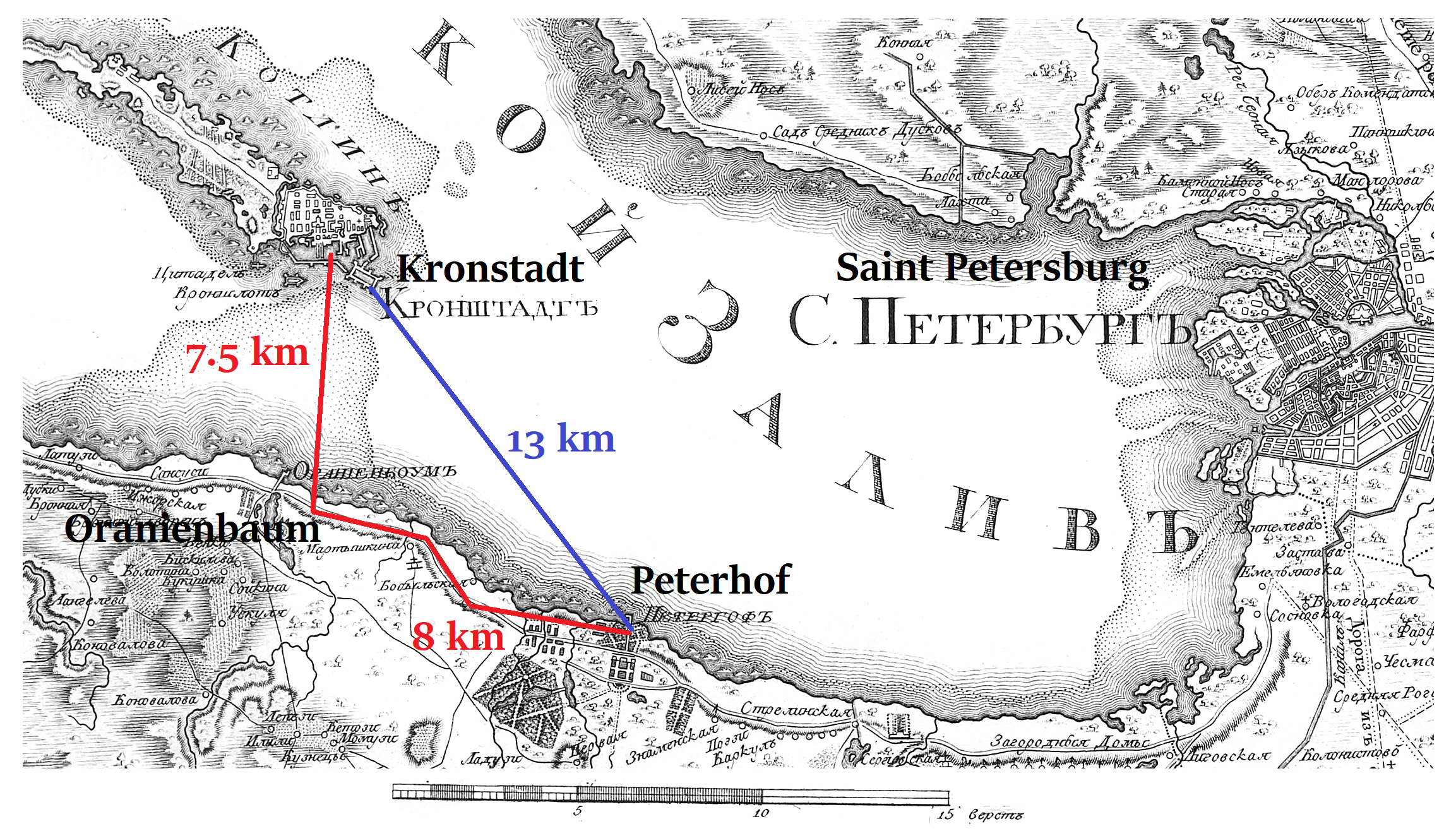
Proposed Kronstadt-Peterhof line according to Schilling (in red) and the approved all-submerged route (blue)

In 1836, Nicholas I created a commission of inquiry to advise on installation of Schilling's telegraph between Kronstadt, an important naval base, and Peterhof Palace. Prince Alexander Menshikov, the Minister of Marine, was appointed president of the commission. An experimental line was set up in the Admiralty building, connecting Menshikov's study with his subordinates' offices. The five-kilometre line was partly overground and partly submerged in the canals, with three intermediate Schweigger multipliers. Menshikov submitted a favourable report and secured the tsar's approval to connect Peterhof with the naval base at Kronstadt, across the Gulf of Finland.

The 1836 telegraph proposed by Schilling was very similar to the 1828 experimental set, with minor improvements made during the Far Eastern expedition. It consisted of voltaic piles, wires, multipliers coupled to repeater switches, and alarm bells. Thin copper wires were insulated with silk-reinforced latex and suspended to load-bearing hemp cables. Each multiplier contained several hundred turns of silver of copper wire on a brass spool. The shaft of its pointer was dampened by immersion in mercury. Signal currents were by design bidirectional ("left" or "right" in Schilling's code tables). Later, Schilling's telegraph was often described as a multi-wire device for sending five or six bits in parallel, however, his 1836 proposal clearly describes a double-wire, serial device.

Schilling knew that all means of insulating submerged cables were inferior to bare overhead wires, and intended to keep the length of submerged cable as short as possible. He proposed laying a 7.5 kilometre submerged cable from Kronstadt to Oranienbaum, the nearest coastal town, and an 8 kilometre surface overhead line along the coast from Oranienbaum to Peterhof. The Committee chaired by Menshikov ridiculed the idea. There were many objections, most important being the breach of security: the coastal line would be visible to any boat passing through the Gulf. Menshikov pressed for the alternative route, a fully submerged 13-kilometre cable directly to Peterhof.

On 31 May [O.S. 19 May] 1837 Menshikov notified Schilling that the tsar had approved a fully submerged construction. Schilling took the project as far as ordering the submarine cable from a rope factory in St. Petersburg, but he died on 6 August (N.S.), (Note: Huurdeman gives the date of Schilling's death as 25 July, but this would seem to be a Julian calendar date (Huurdeman, p. 54).) and the project was subsequently cancelled.

==== Single-wire code ====
Schilling is sometimes credited with being the first to devise a code for a single-wire telegraph, but there is some doubt about how many needles he used and at what dates. It may be that Schilling used a single-needle-only setup on demonstrations around Europe merely for ease of transport, or it may have been a later design inspired by the Gauss and Weber telegraph, in which case he would not have been the first. The code alleged to have been used with this telegraph can be traced to Alfred Vail, but the variable-length code (like Morse code) given by Vail is merely shown as an example of how it could be used. In any case, two-element signalling alphabets predate any form of electrical telegraphy by some time. According to Hubbard, it is more likely that Schilling used the same code as used on the six-needle telegraph, but with the bits sent serially instead of in parallel.

==== Automatic recording ====
Schilling looked into the possibility of automatic recording of telegraph signals, but could not make it work due to the complexity of the device. His electrical engineering successor, Jacobi, succeeded in doing this in 1841 on a telegraph line from the Winter Palace to the General Staff Headquarters.

=== Mines and fuses ===
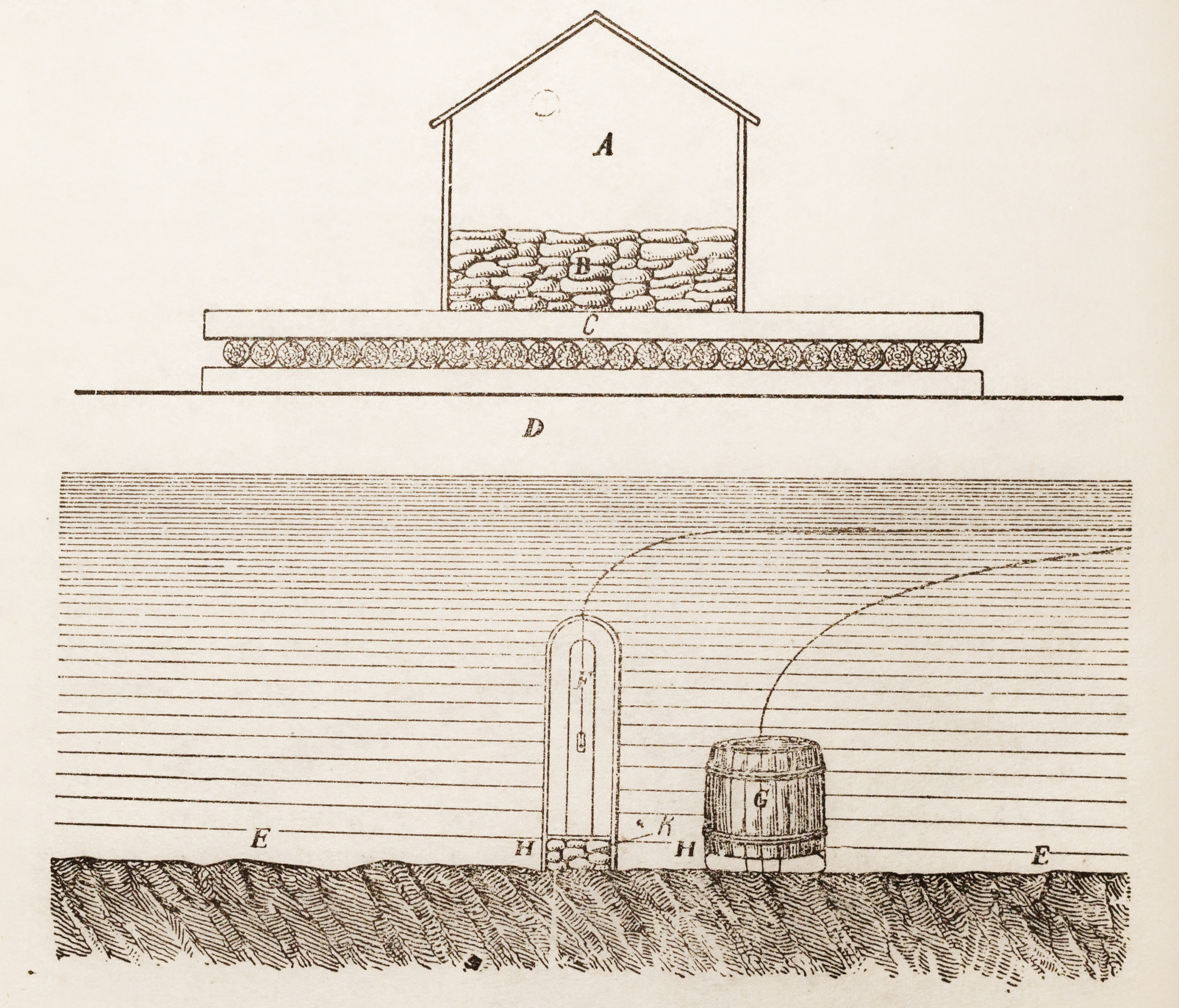
Test rig for naval mines employing the Schilling fuse, as demonstrated by Schilder on March 21, 1833. The target structure A-C, made of wood and ice blocks and placed on thick ice D, emulates a wooden frigate.

Another field of Schilling's research, directly related to telegraphy, was practical military applications of electricity for remote control of land and naval mines. In 1811 Johann Schweigger suggested the idea of exploding bubbles of hydrogen released from the electrolyte by passing electric current. Schilling discussed the idea with Sommering, and realised the military prospects for the invention. He devised a water resistant conducting wire that could be laid in wet earth or through rivers. It consisted of a copper wire insulated with a mixture of India-rubber and varnish. Schilling had in mind the military use of telegraphy in the field as well, and was excited about the prospects. Sömmerring wrote in his diary "Schilling is quite childish about his electro-conducting cord."

In September 1812 Schilling demonstrated his first remote-controlled naval fuse to Alexander I on the Neva River in Saint Petersburg. The invention was intended for coastal defense and sieges, and was deemed unsuitable for the fast-paced maneuver warfare of the 1812 campaign. The Schilling fuse, patented in 1813, contained two pointed carbon electrodes that produced an electric arc. The electrode assembly was placed in a sealed box filled with fine-grained gunpowder, which was ignited by the arc.

In 1822 Schilling demonstrated the land version of his fuse to Alexander I at Krasnoye Selo; in 1827 another Schilling mine was shown to Nicholas I. This time the test was supervised by military engineer Karl Schilder, an influential Imperial Guard officer and an inventor in his own right. Schilder pushed the proposal through the bureaucracy, and in April 1828 the Inspector general of military engineers authorised development of electrically-fired mines for series production. Russia had just entered the war with the Ottoman Empire, which frequently involved sieges of Turkish defenses in the Caucasus. The main problem that Schilling faced was the lack of batteries fit for field service, an issue not resolved until after the end of hostilities. According to Russian biographers of both Schilling and Schilder, reports of electrically-fired mines being used during the siege of Silistra are almost certainly incorrect.

Immediately after his return from Siberia, Schilling resumed work on mines and fuses. In September 1832 a series of electrically-fired land mines, imitating both defensive and offensive operations, were successfully tested by Schilder's battalion. This time the technology was ready for deployment and was issued to the Army; Schilling was awarded the Order of Saint Vladimir, 2nd class. Schilling continued improving land mines until the end of his life. In March 1834 Schilder test-fired the first naval mine employing insulated wires invented by Schilling; in 1835 the military performed the first test demolition of a bridge with an electrically-fired underwater charge. These demolition sets were produced and issued to military engineers' units from 1836 onwards. On the other hand, the Russian Navy resisted the novelty until the invention of a reliable contact fuse by Moritz von Jacobi in 1840.

== Legacy ==
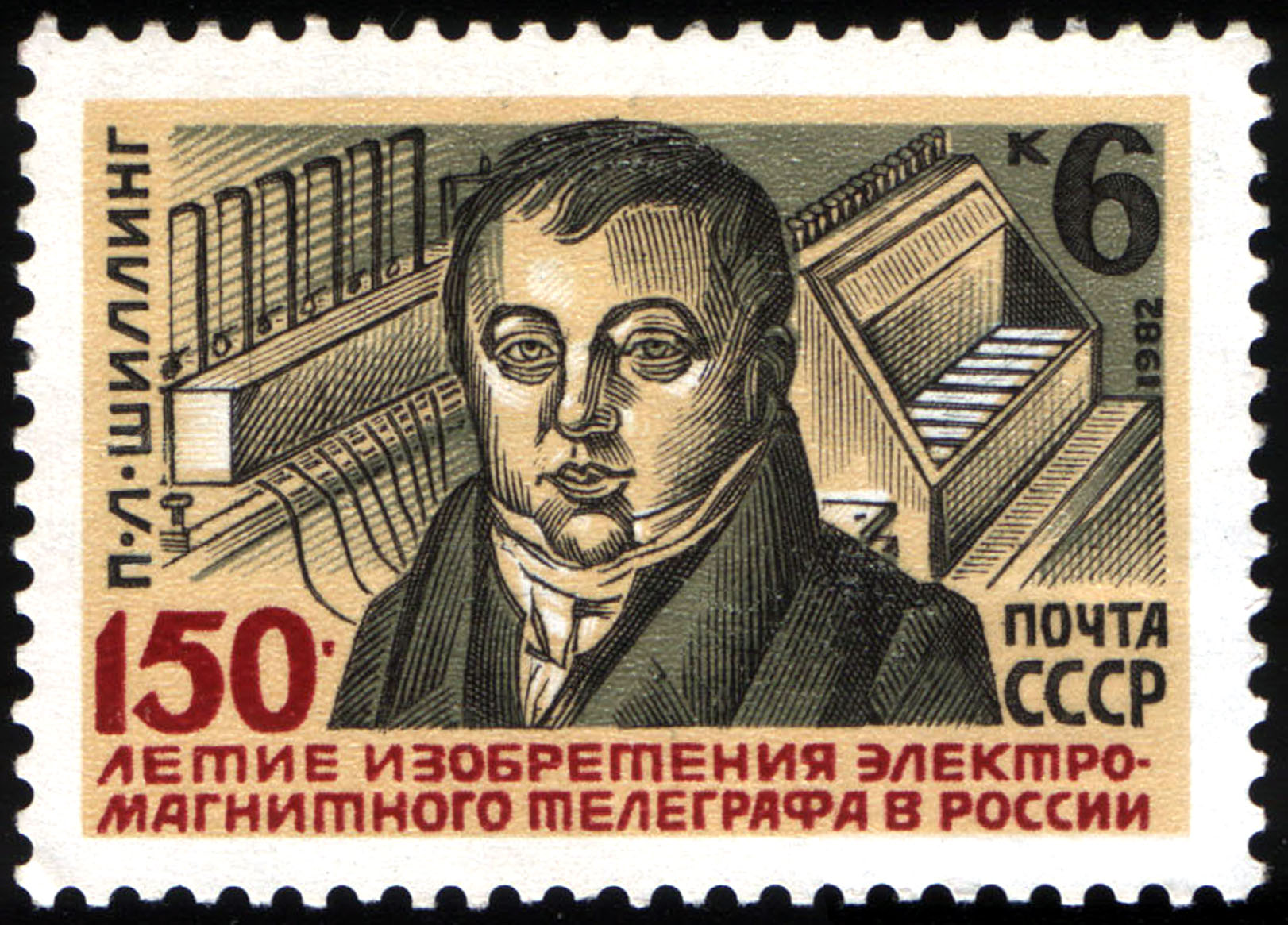
A 1982 six kopek postage stamp from the USSR commemorating the 150th anniversary of Pavel Schilling's telegraph invention

Schilling maintained regular correspondence with many scientists, writers and politicians, and was well known to Western European academic communities. He arranged publications of historical manuscripts and provided oriental sorts and matrices to European print shops; however, during his lifetime he never attempted to publish a book in his own name or to submit an article to a journal. The only known publication, the preface to the Index of the Narthang Kangyur, was printed posthumously and anonymously. His studies of oriental languages and Buddhist texts were soon forgotten. The real author of the Index was "rediscovered" in 1847, and then forgotten again. Schilling's research into telegraphy is much better known; the physicists and engineers who wrote about Schilling were concerned primarily with his telegraph, and thus shaped the public image of Schilling as an engineer. Later, various authors wrote about Schilling's oriental studies and travels, his collaborations with European academics and Russian poets, but none managed to grasp all the facets of his personality. Schilling the linguist, Schilling the engineer and Schilling the socialite apparently acted as three different persons. Moritz von Jacobi was probably the only contemporary who directly linked Schilling's achievements in telecommunications to his underlying proficiency in linguistics.

The Schilling needle telegraph was never used as such, but it is partly the ancestor of the Cooke and Wheatstone telegraph, a system widely used in the United Kingdom and British Empire in the nineteenth century. Some of the instruments of that system remained in use well into the twentieth century. Schilling's demonstration in Frankfurt was attended by Georg Wilhelm Muncke who subsequently had an exact copy of Schilling's apparatus made. Muncke used this for demonstrations in lectures. One of these lectures was attended by William Fothergill Cooke, who was inspired to build a version of Schilling's telegraph of his own, although he did not realise that the instrument he saw was due to Schilling. He abandoned this method for practical use in favour of electromagnetic clockwork solutions for a while, apparently believing that needle telegraphs always required multiple wires. That Schilling's method of suspending the needle by a thread horizontally was not very convenient was also an influence. This changed when he partnered with Charles Wheatstone and the telegraph they then built together was a multiple-needle telegraph, but with a rather more robust mounting based on the galvanometer of Macedonio Melloni. There is no evidence for the claim sometimes advanced that Wheatstone also lectured with a copy of Schilling's telegraph, although he certainly knew about it and lectured on its implications.

Schilling's original telegraph of 1832 is currently displayed in the telegraph collection of the A.S. Popov Central Museum of Communications. The instrument was previously on exhibition at the Paris Electrical Exhibition of 1881. His contributions to electrical telegraphy were named an IEEE Milestone in 2009. The Adamini Building at 7 Marsovo Pole, St. Petersburg, where Schilling lived in the 1830s and where he died, has a memorial plaque placed in 1886 to mark the centennial of his birth.

== Bibliography ==
- Artemenko, Roman, "Павел Шиллинг - изобретатель электромагнитного телеграфа" ["Pavel Schilling - inventor of the electromagnetic telegraph"], ITWeek, vol. 3, iss. 321, 29 January 2002 (in Russian).
- Bermel, Neil, Linguistic Authority, Language Ideology, and Metaphor: The Czech Orthography Wars, Walter de Gruyter, 2008 ISBN 3110197669.
- Dudley, Leonard, Mothers of Innovation: How Expanding Social Networks Gave Birth to the Industrial Revolution, Cambridge Scholars Publishing, 2012 ISBN 1443843121.
- Fahie, John Joseph, A History of Electric Telegraphy, to the Year 1837, London: E. & F.N. Spon, 1884 OCLC 559318239.
- Garratt, G.R.M., "The early history of telegraphy", Philips Technical Review, vol. 26, no. 8/9, pp. 268–284, 21 April 1966.
- Hamel, Joseph von, Historical Account of the Introduction of the Galvanic and Electro-magnetic Telegraph, London: W. Trounce, 1859 OCLC 25124947.
- Hubbard, Geoffrey, Cooke and Wheatstone: And the Invention of the Electric Telegraph, Routledge, 2013 ISBN 1135028508.
- Huurdeman, A.A., The Worldwide History of Telecommunications, Wiley, 2003 ISBN 0471205052
- Shaffner, Taliaferro Preston, The Telegraph Manual, Pudney & Russell, 1859 OCLC 258508686.
- Siegert, Bernard, Relays: Literature as an Epoch of the Postal System, Stanford University Press, 1999 ISBN 0804732388.
- Uspensky, V.L. (2010). "Printing Tibetan Books in Russia in the 19th to Early 20th Centuries". Collectanea Himalayica 3. Edition, éditions l'écrit au Tibet, évolution et devenir (PDF). Indus Verlag. pp. 429–439.
- Vail, Alfred, The American Electro Magnetic Telegraph, Lea & Blanchard, 1845 OCLC 933149657.
- Walravens, Hartmut (2020). "Letters by J.P.A. Rémusat to Schilling von Canstadt (1817–1829) in the Orientalists Archives of the Institute of Oriental Manuscripts, Russian Academy of Sciences" (PDF). Written Monuments of the Orient. 6 (1(11)). Institute of Oriental Manuscripts, Russian Academy of Sciences: 117–143. doi:10.17816/wmo35191.
- Yarotsky, A.V., "150th anniversary of the electromagnetic telegraph", Telecommunication Journal, vol. 49, no. 10, pp. 709–715, October 1982.
- Chuguevsky, L. I. (1963). "Шиллинг П.Л." [P. L. Schilling] (PDF). Бюллетень Архива Востоковедов (Bulletin of the Oriental Archive) (in Russian). 3: 63–86.
- Samokhin, V. P.; Tikhomirova, E. A. (2017). "Памяти П. Л. Шиллинга (1786 - 1837)" [In memoriam P.L.Schilling (1786-1837)]. Машиностроение И Компьютерные Технологии (in Russian) (10): 70–103.
- Tsyrempilov, N. (2017). "Сангха в эпоху упадка. Реакция российских буддистов на Русскую революцию и Гражданскую войну" [The Sangha in the Age of Degradation. Responses of the Russian Buddhists to the Revolution and Civil War] (PDF). Gosudarstvo, Religiya Tserkov V Rossii I Za Rubezhom (in Russian). 37 (1–2): 347–370.
- Uspensky, V.L. (2011). "Экспедиция барона П. Л. Шиллинга фон Канштадта в Сибирь в 1830―1832 годы и ее значение для тибетологии и монголоведения" [Expedition of Baron Schilling von Cannstadt to Siberia, 1830-1832)] (PDF). Международная Научно-практическая Конференция «Рериховское Наследие» (in Russian). VIII: 291–295.
- Yarotsky, A.V. (1963). Павел Львович Шиллинг 1786-1837 [Pavel Lvovich Schilling] (in Russian) (2nd ed.). Izd. AN SSSR.
- Zorin, A.V. (2017). "Введение" [Preface]. Каталог сочинений тибетского буддийского канона из собрания ИВР РАН. Вып. 1: Кагьюр и Тэнгьюр [Catalogue of the Tibetan Buddhist Canon collection at the Institute of Eastern Languages, issue I] (PDF) (in Russian). Петербургское востоковедение - Orientalia. pp. 6–15. ISBN 978-5-85803-506-0.
