= Kroppen =

- Municipality
- Location of Kroppen within Oberspreewald-Lausitz district
- Interactive map of Kroppen
- Location within Germany Location within Brandenburg
- Coordinates: 51°22′59″N 13°48′00″E
- Country: Germany
- State: Brandenburg
- District: Oberspreewald-Lausitz
- Municipal assoc.: Ortrand
- Subdivisions: 2 Ortsteile

Government
  - Mayor (2024–29): Reiner Krämer

Area
  - Total: 15.16 km^{2} (5.85 sq mi)
- Elevation: 112 m (367 ft)

Population (2025-12-31)
  - Total: 699
  - Density: 46.1/km^{2} (119/sq mi)
- Time zone: UTC+01:00 (CET)
  - Summer (DST): UTC+02:00 (CEST)
- Postal codes: 01945
- Dialling codes: 035755
- Vehicle registration: OSL
- Website: www.kroppen-osl.de

Kroppen is a municipality in the Oberspreewald-Lausitz district, in Upper Lusatia, Brandenburg, Germany.

== History ==
From 1815 to 1825, Kroppen was part of the Prussian Province of Brandenburg, from 1825 to 1919 of the Province of Silesia, from 1919 to 1938 of the Province of Lower Silesia, again from 1938 to 1941 of the Province of Silesia and again from 1941 to 1945 of the Province of Lower Silesia. From 1945 to 1952 it was part of Saxony and from 1952 to 1990 of the Bezirk Cottbus of East Germany.

== Demography ==
Development of Population since 1875 within the Current Boundaries (Blue Line: Population; Dotted Line: Comparison to Population Development of Brandenburg state; Grey Background: Time of Nazi rule; Red Background: Time of Communist rule)

Kroppen: Population development
within the current boundaries (2013)

Year	Pop.	±% p.a.
1875	500	—
1890	540	+0.51%
1910	550	+0.09%
1925	589	+0.46%
1933	580	−0.19%
1939	707	+3.36%
1946	820	+2.14%
1950	908	+2.58%
1964	1,008	+0.75%
1971	971	−0.53%
1981	925	−0.48%
1985	916	−0.24%
1989	860	−1.56%
1990	848	−1.40%
1991	840	−0.94%
1992	835	−0.60%
1993	827	−0.96%
1994	826	−0.12%
1995	819	−0.85%
1996	823	+0.49%

Year	Pop.	±% p.a.
1997	814	−1.09%
1998	828	+1.72%
1999	817	−1.33%
2000	825	+0.98%
2001	804	−2.55%
2002	775	−3.61%
2003	778	+0.39%
2004	770	−1.03%
2005	762	−1.04%
2006	753	−1.18%
2007	759	+0.80%
2008	746	−1.71%
2009	721	−3.35%
2010	721	+0.00%
2011	710	−1.53%
2012	697	−1.83%
2013	682	−2.15%
2014	679	−0.44%
2015	676	−0.44%
2016	678	+0.30%
