= Frauendorf =

- Municipality
- Location of Frauendorf within Oberspreewald-Lausitz district
- Interactive map of Frauendorf
- Location within Germany Location within Brandenburg
- Coordinates: 51°25′00″N 13°46′00″E
- Country: Germany
- State: Brandenburg
- District: Oberspreewald-Lausitz
- Municipal assoc.: Ortrand

Government
  - Mayor (2024–29): Mirko Friedrich

Area
  - Total: 20.77 km^{2} (8.02 sq mi)
- Elevation: 100 m (330 ft)

Population (2025-12-31)
  - Total: 702
  - Density: 33.8/km^{2} (87.5/sq mi)
- Time zone: UTC+01:00 (CET)
  - Summer (DST): UTC+02:00 (CEST)
- Postal codes: 01945
- Dialling codes: 035755
- Vehicle registration: OSL
- Website: www.gemeinde-frauendorf.de

Frauendorf (Lower Sorbian: Žeńske jsy; Upper Sorbian: Ženjadwor) is a municipality in the Oberspreewald-Lausitz district, in Upper Lusatia, Brandenburg, Germany.

== History ==
From 1815 to 1825, Frauendorf was part of the Prussian Province of Brandenburg. From 1825 to 1919 it was part of the Province of Silesia, from 1919 to 1938 of the Province of Lower Silesia, again from 1938 to 1941 of the Province of Silesia and again from 1941 to 1945 of the Province of Lower Silesia. From 1945 to 1952 it was part of Saxony and from 1952 of the Bezirk Cottbus of East Germany.

== Demography ==
Development of Population since 1875 within the Current Boundaries (Blue Line: Population; Dotted Line: Comparison to Population Development of Brandenburg state; Grey Background: Time of Nazi rule; Red Background: Time of Communist rule)

Frauendorf: Population development
within the current boundaries (2013)

Year	Pop.	±% p.a.
1875	600	—
1890	600	+0.00%
1910	650	+0.40%
1925	685	+0.35%
1933	780	+1.64%
1939	849	+1.42%
1946	940	+1.47%
1950	997	+1.48%
1964	957	−0.29%
1971	917	−0.61%
1981	937	+0.22%
1985	937	+0.00%
1989	936	−0.03%
1990	937	+0.11%
1991	937	+0.00%
1992	937	+0.00%
1993	818	−12.70%
1994	819	+0.12%
1995	818	−0.12%
1996	820	+0.24%

Year	Pop.	±% p.a.
1997	822	+0.24%
1998	831	+1.09%
1999	849	+2.17%
2000	829	−2.36%
2001	823	−0.72%
2002	806	−2.07%
2003	815	+1.12%
2004	804	−1.35%
2005	798	−0.75%
2006	804	+0.75%
2007	783	−2.61%
2008	779	−0.51%
2009	770	−1.16%
2010	756	−1.82%
2011	724	−4.23%
2012	727	+0.41%
2013	713	−1.93%
2014	705	−1.12%
2015	696	−1.28%
2016	687	−1.29%
