= Tettau, Brandenburg =

Tettau
- Municipality
- Coat of arms

- Location of Tettau within Oberspreewald-Lausitz district
- Interactive map of Tettau
- Location within Germany Location within Brandenburg
- Coordinates: 51°26′N 13°44′E
- Country: Germany
- State: Brandenburg
- District: Oberspreewald-Lausitz
- Municipal assoc.: Ortrand

Government
  - Mayor (2024–29): Joachim Nitzsche

Area
  - Total: 8.84 km^{2} (3.41 sq mi)
- Elevation: 94 m (308 ft)

Population (2025-12-31)
  - Total: 750
  - Density: 85/km^{2} (220/sq mi)
- Time zone: UTC+01:00 (CET)
  - Summer (DST): UTC+02:00 (CEST)
- Postal codes: 01945
- Dialling codes: 03574
- Vehicle registration: OSL
- Website: www.tettau-osl.de

Tettau (German pronunciation: [ˈtɛtaʊ]; Upper Sorbian: Těta; Lower Sorbian: Tětow) is a municipality in the Oberspreewald-Lausitz district, in Upper Lusatia, Brandenburg, Germany.

== History ==
From 1815 to 1825, Tettau was part of the Prussian Province of Brandenburg, from 1825 to 1919 of the Province of Silesia, from 1919 to 1938 of the Province of Lower Silesia, again from 1938 to 1941 of the Province of Silesia and again from 1941 to 1945 of the Province of Lower Silesia. From 1945 to 1952 it was part of Saxony and from 1952 to 1990 of the Bezirk Cottbus of East Germany.

== Demography ==
Development of Population since 1875 within the Current Boundaries (Blue Line: Population; Dotted Line: Comparison to Population Development of Brandenburg state; Grey Background: Time of Nazi rule; Red Background: Time of Communist rule)

Tettau: Population development
within the current boundaries (2013)

Year	Pop.	±% p.a.
1875	300	—
1890	340	+0.84%
1910	400	+0.82%
1925	436	+0.58%
1933	506	+1.88%
1939	589	+2.56%
1946	678	+2.03%
1950	765	+3.06%
1964	873	+0.95%
1971	980	+1.67%
1981	1,095	+1.12%
1985	1,062	−0.76%
1989	963	−2.42%
1990	948	−1.56%
1991	910	−4.01%
1992	902	−0.88%
1993	1,014	+12.42%
1994	996	−1.78%
1995	1,001	+0.50%
1996	995	−0.60%

Year	Pop.	±% p.a.
1997	973	−2.21%
1998	972	−0.10%
1999	946	−2.67%
2000	932	−1.48%
2001	917	−1.61%
2002	915	−0.22%
2003	902	−1.42%
2004	892	−1.11%
2005	881	−1.23%
2006	857	−2.72%
2007	841	−1.87%
2008	834	−0.83%
2009	827	−0.84%
2010	828	+0.12%
2011	826	−0.24%
2012	803	−2.78%
2013	795	−1.00%
2014	804	+1.13%
2015	789	−1.87%
2016	783	−0.76%
