= Ortrand (Amt) =

- Amt
- Map of Oberspreewald-Lausitz highlighting Ortrand
- Interactive map of Ortrand
- Location within Germany Location within Brandenburg
- Coordinates: 51°23′N 13°45′E
- Country: Germany
- State: Brandenburg
- District: Oberspreewald-Lausitz
- Seat: Ortrand
- Subdivisions: 6 municipalities

Area
  - Total: 77.33 km^{2} (29.86 sq mi)

Population (2025-12-31)
  - Total: 5,869
  - Density: 75.90/km^{2} (196.6/sq mi)
- Time zone: UTC+01:00 (CET)
  - Summer (DST): UTC+02:00 (CEST)
- Website: www.amt-ortrand.de

Amt Ortrand is an Amt ("collective municipality") in the district of Oberspreewald-Lausitz, in Brandenburg, Germany. Its seat is in Ortrand.

The Amt Ortrand consists of the following municipalities:

1. Frauendorf
2. Großkmehlen
3. Kroppen
4. Lindenau
5. Ortrand
6. Tettau

== Demography ==
Development of Population since 1875 within the Current Boundaries (Blue Line: Population; Dotted Line: Comparison to Population Development of Brandenburg state; Grey Background: Time of Nazi rule; Red Background: Time of Communist rule)

Recent Population Development and Projections (Population Development before Census 2011 (blue line); Recent Population Development according to the Census in Germany in 2011 (blue bordered line); Official projections for 2005-2030 (yellow line); for 2017-2030 (scarlet line); for 2020-2030 (green line)

Amt Ortrand: Population development
within the current boundaries (2020)

Year	Pop.	±% p.a.
1875	4,439	—
1890	4,623	+0.27%
1910	5,164	+0.55%
1925	5,627	+0.57%
1939	6,393	+0.92%
1950	8,465	+2.58%
1964	8,619	+0.13%
1971	8,720	+0.17%
1981	8,423	−0.35%

Year	Pop.	±% p.a.
1985	8,382	−0.12%
1990	7,898	−1.18%
1995	7,605	−0.75%
2000	7,352	−0.67%
2005	7,004	−0.97%
2010	6,481	−1.54%
2015	6,142	−1.07%
2020	5,993	−0.49%
2025	5,869	−0.42%
