= Johann Samuel Traugott Gehler =

German lawyer and physicist (1751–1795)

Johann Samuel Traugott Gehler (1 November 1751, in Görlitz – 16 October 1795, in Leipzig) was a German lawyer and physicist who lived in the Holy Roman Empire.

He studied mathematics, natural sciences and law at the University of Leipzig, obtaining his habilitation for mathematics in 1776 and his law degree the following year. While a student, his influences included physicist Johann Heinrich Winckler. In 1783 he became a city councilman in Leipzig, and from 1786 served as an associate at the Oberhofgericht Leipzig.

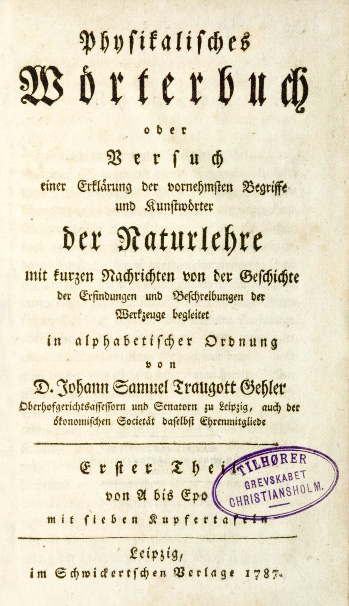
Title page of Gehler's Physikalisches Wörterbuch (1787)

He is best remembered as the author of a popular dictionary of physical sciences, Physikalisches Wörterbuch, published from 1787 in six volumes. Decades later, the dictionary was edited and re-issued in 11 volumes (1825–45); its editors being Heinrich Wilhelm Brandes, Leopold Gmelin, Johann Caspar Horner, Carl Ludwig Littrow, Christian Heinrich Pfaff and Georg Wilhelm Muncke. In 1783 he published a German translation of Tiberius Cavallo's A complete treatise on electricity as Vollständige Abhandlung der theoretischen und praktischen Lehre von der Electricität. In 1796 his translation of Fourcroy's Philosophie chimique was published with the title Philosophie oder Grundwahrheiten der neuern Chemie.
