= Ortrand =

- Town
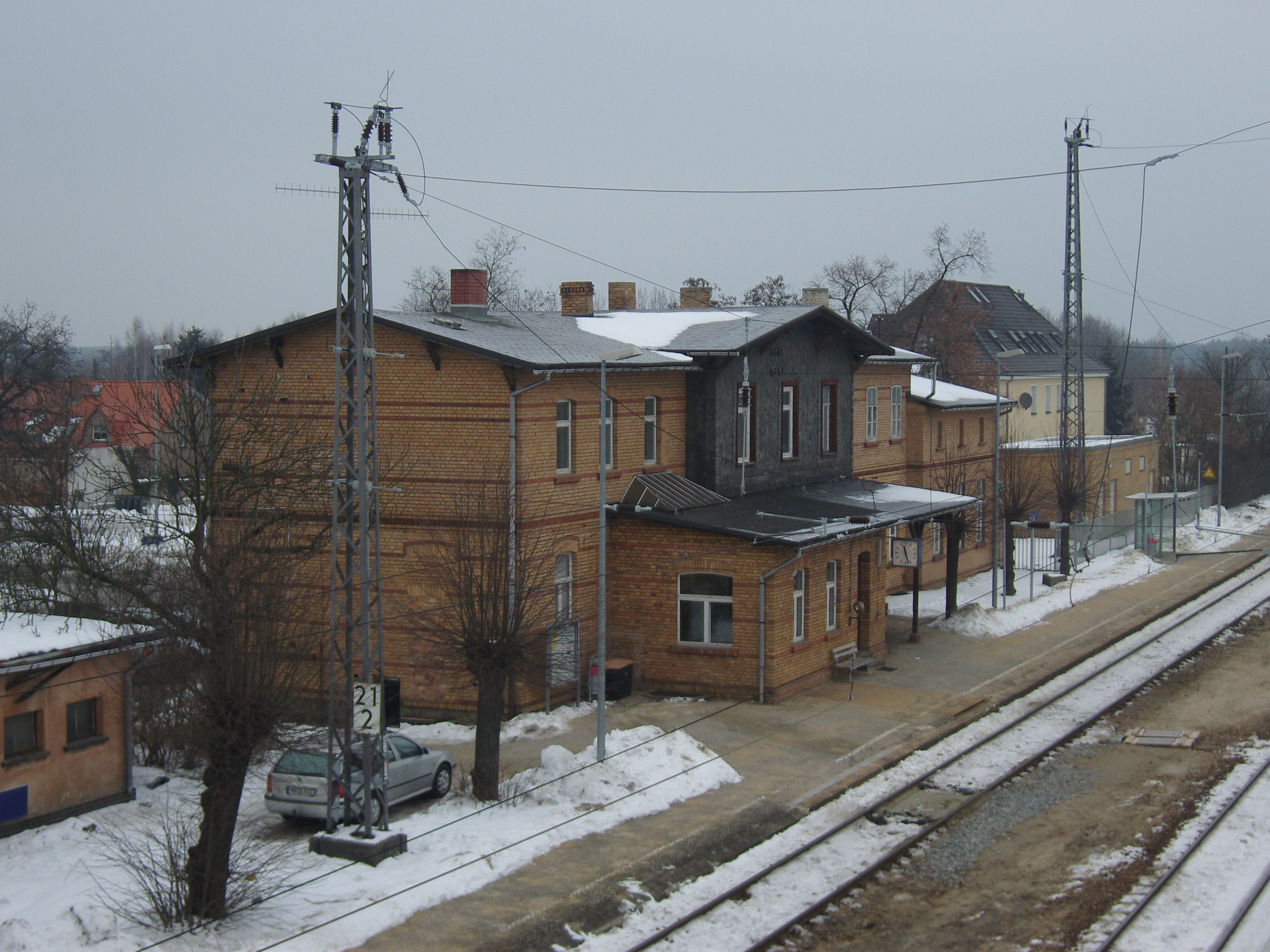
- Train station

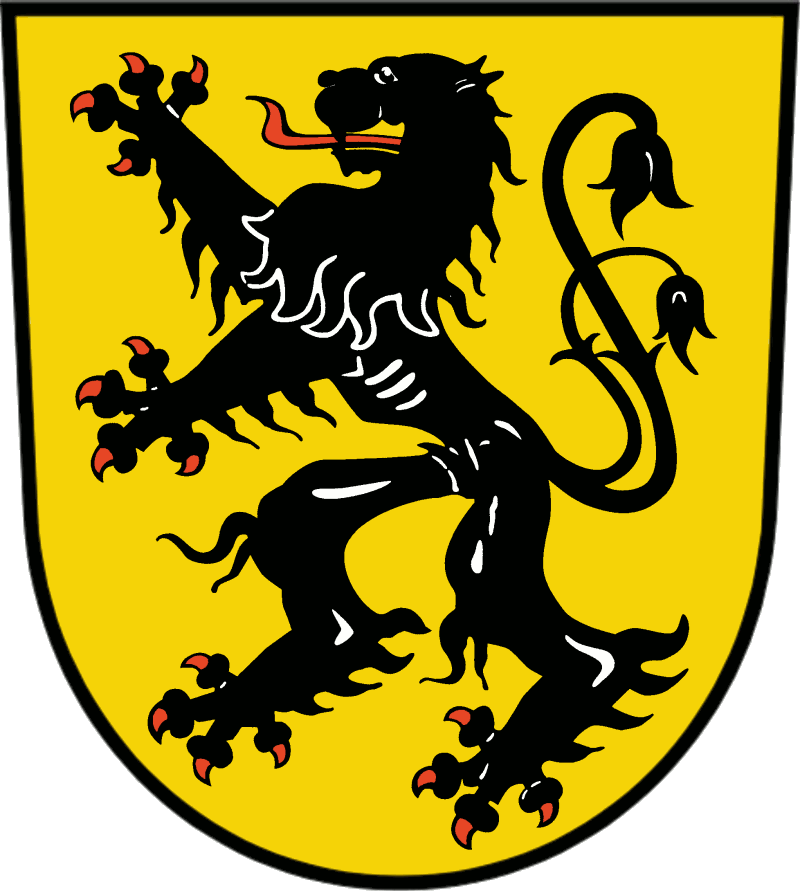
- Coat of arms

- Location of Ortrand within Oberspreewald-Lausitz district
- Interactive map of Ortrand
- Location within Germany Location within Brandenburg
- Coordinates: 51°22′00″N 13°46′59″E
- Country: Germany
- State: Brandenburg
- District: Oberspreewald-Lausitz
- Municipal assoc.: Ortrand

Government
  - Mayor (2024–29): Maik Bethke

Area
  - Total: 7.34 km^{2} (2.83 sq mi)
- Elevation: 110 m (360 ft)

Population (2025-12-31)
  - Total: 1,966
  - Density: 268/km^{2} (694/sq mi)
- Time zone: UTC+01:00 (CET)
  - Summer (DST): UTC+02:00 (CEST)
- Postal codes: 01990
- Dialling codes: 035755
- Vehicle registration: OSL
- Website: www.stadt-ortrand.de

Ortrand (German pronunciation: [ˈɔʁtʁant]; Upper Sorbian: Wótrań, pronounced [ˈwʊtʁajn]) is a town in the Oberspreewald-Lausitz district, in southern Brandenburg, Germany. It is situated 24 km southwest of Senftenberg, and 36 km north of Dresden.

== History ==
From 1815 to 1944, Ortrand was part of the Prussian Province of Saxony and from 1944 to 1945 of the Province of Halle-Merseburg. From 1947 to 1952 it was part of Saxony-Anhalt and from 1952 to 1990 of the Bezirk Cottbus of East Germany.

== Demography ==
Development of population since 1875 within the current boundaries (Blue line: Population; Dotted line: Comparison to population development of Brandenburg state; Grey background: Time of Nazi rule; Red background: Time of communist rule)

Ortrand: Population development
within the current boundaries (2013)

Year	Pop.	±% p.a.
1875	1,739	—
1890	1,793	+0.20%
1910	2,054	+0.68%
1925	2,288	+0.72%
1933	2,416	+0.68%
1939	2,574	+1.06%
1946	3,268	+3.47%
1950	3,259	−0.07%
1964	3,143	−0.26%
1971	3,152	+0.04%
1981	3,049	−0.33%
1985	3,070	+0.17%
1989	2,946	−1.03%
1990	2,839	−3.63%
1991	2,846	+0.25%
1992	2,802	−1.55%
1993	2,776	−0.93%
1994	2,744	−1.15%
1995	2,739	−0.18%
1996	2,740	+0.04%

Year	Pop.	±% p.a.
1997	2,721	−0.69%
1998	2,716	−0.18%
1999	2,680	−1.33%
2000	2,634	−1.72%
2001	2,601	−1.25%
2002	2,570	−1.19%
2003	2,539	−1.21%
2004	2,544	+0.20%
2005	2,504	−1.57%
2006	2,430	−2.96%
2007	2,370	−2.47%
2008	2,316	−2.28%
2009	2,295	−0.91%
2010	2,265	−1.31%
2011	2,257	−0.35%
2012	2,213	−1.95%
2013	2,196	−0.77%
2014	2,164	−1.46%
2015	2,154	−0.46%
2016	2,144	−0.46%

== Sons and daughters of the town ==
- Paul Lindau (1881-1945), sculptor
- Lutz Heßlich (born 1959), track racing cyclist, Olympic champion 1980 and 1988
- Gloria Siebert (born 1964), hurdler
