= Georg Wilhelm Muncke =

German physicist

Georg Wilhelm Muncke or Georg Wilhelm Munke (28 November 1772, in Hilligsfeld – 17 October 1847, in Großkmehlen) was a German physicist.

From 1797 to 1810 he worked as an administrator at the Georgianum in Hanover. In 1810 he became a professor at the University of Marburg, where he gave lectures in mathematics and experimental physics. From 1817 up until his death in 1847 he was a professor of physics at the University of Heidelberg. In 1826 he became an honorary member of the Russian Academy of Sciences.

== Published works ==
- System der atomistischen Physik. Nach den neuesten Erfahrungen und Versuchen dargestellt (1809) – System of atomic physics.
- Handbuch der Naturlehre, (2 volumes, 1829) – Manual of natural science.
- Die ersten Elemente der gesammten Naturlehre zum Gebrauche für höhere Schulen und Gymnasien, 1842 – The first elements of the doctrine of nature.
- Populäre Wärmelehre; oder, Darstellung des Wesens und Verhaltens der Wärme, 1847 – Popular thermodynamics; or, representation of the nature and behavior of heat.

Also, he was the author of scientific papers on magnetism, electromagnetism, thermoelectrics, telegraphy, etc. With other scientists, he collaborated on a new edition of Johann Samuel Traugott Gehler's Physikalisches Wörterbunch (11 volumes, 1825–45).

== See also ==
- Needle telegraph
