= Großkmehlen =

- Municipality
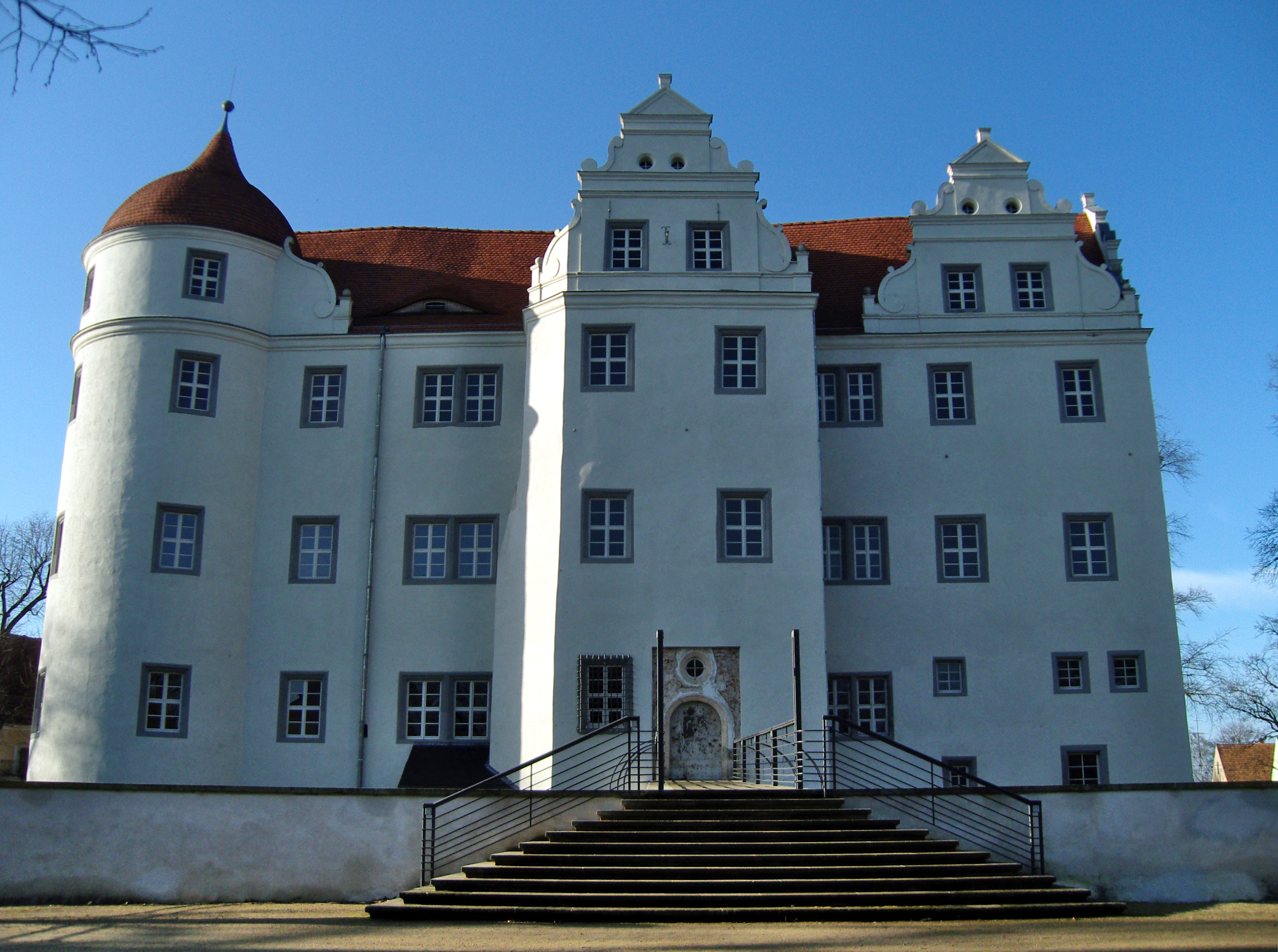
- Castle

- Location of Großkmehlen within Oberspreewald-Lausitz district
- Interactive map of Großkmehlen
- Location within Germany Location within Brandenburg
- Coordinates: 51°23′N 13°44′E
- Country: Germany
- State: Brandenburg
- District: Oberspreewald-Lausitz
- Municipal assoc.: Ortrand
- Subdivisions: 3 Ortsteile

Government
  - Mayor (2024–29): Dietmar Bruntsch

Area
  - Total: 13.75 km^{2} (5.31 sq mi)
- Elevation: 108 m (354 ft)

Population (2025-12-31)
  - Total: 1,014
  - Density: 73.75/km^{2} (191.0/sq mi)
- Time zone: UTC+01:00 (CET)
  - Summer (DST): UTC+02:00 (CEST)
- Postal codes: 01990
- Dialling codes: 035755
- Vehicle registration: OSL
- Website: www.grosskmehlen.de

Großkmehlen (Upper Sorbian: Hłódmehl) is a municipality in the Oberspreewald-Lausitz district, in southern Brandenburg, Germany. The places of the municipality Großkmehlen belong to the few places in the southern part of the district Oberspreewald-Lausitz, which are not located in Lusatia.

== History ==
From 1815 to 1944, Großkmehlen was part of the Prussian Province of Saxony and from 1944 to 1945 of the Province of Halle-Merseburg. From 1952 to 1990, it was part of the Bezirk Cottbus of East Germany.

== Demography ==
Development of Population since 1875 within the Current Boundaries (Blue Line: Population; Dotted Line: Comparison to Population Development of Brandenburg state; Grey Background: Time of Nazi rule; Red Background: Time of Communist rule)

Großkmehlen: Population development
within the current boundaries (2013)

Year	Pop.	±% p.a.
1875	850	—
1890	870	+0.16%
1910	910	+0.23%
1925	966	+0.40%
1933	966	+0.00%
1939	984	+0.31%
1946	1,467	+5.87%
1950	1,627	+2.62%
1964	1,623	−0.02%
1971	1,668	+0.39%
1981	1,541	−0.79%
1985	1,517	−0.39%
1989	1,460	−0.95%
1990	1,439	−1.44%
1991	1,410	−2.02%
1992	1,396	−0.99%
1993	1,430	+2.44%
1994	1,360	−4.90%
1995	1,355	−0.37%
1996	1,351	−0.30%

Year	Pop.	±% p.a.
1997	1,342	−0.67%
1998	1,323	−1.42%
1999	1,326	+0.23%
2000	1,332	+0.45%
2001	1,333	+0.08%
2002	1,325	−0.60%
2003	1,312	−0.98%
2004	1,289	−1.75%
2005	1,286	−0.23%
2006	1,267	−1.48%
2007	1,255	−0.95%
2008	1,237	−1.43%
2009	1,176	−4.93%
2010	1,182	+0.51%
2011	1,097	−7.19%
2012	1,105	+0.73%
2013	1,094	−1.00%
2014	1,097	+0.27%
2015	1,086	−1.00%
2016	1,103	+1.57%
