= Peitz (Amt) =

- Amt
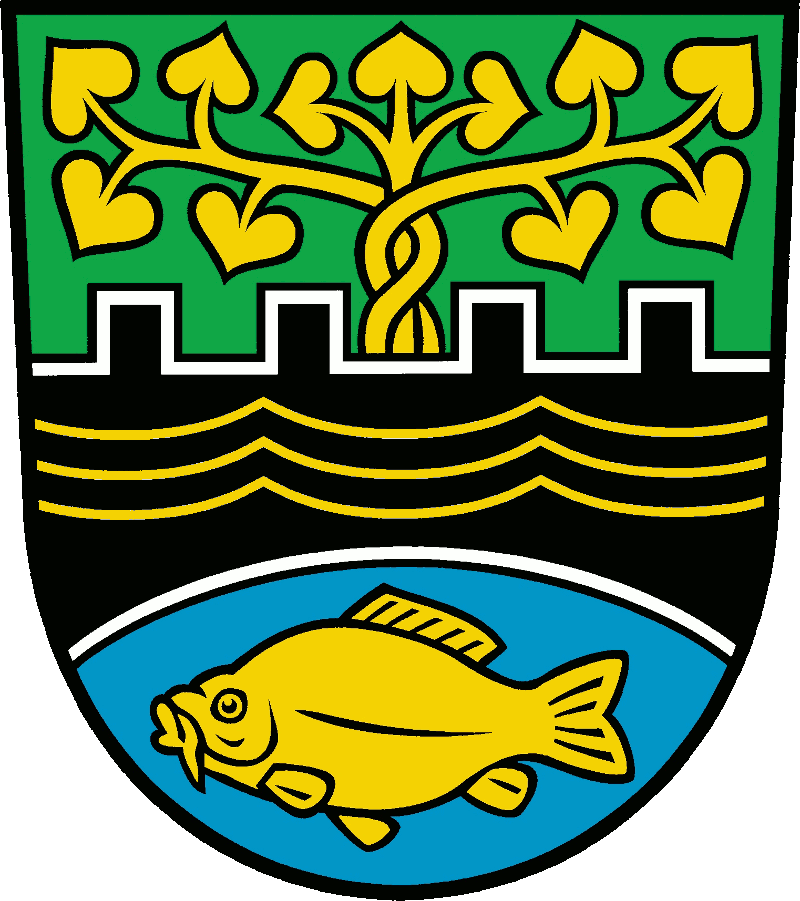
- Coat of arms

- Map of Spree-Neiße highlighting Peitz
- Interactive map of Peitz
- Location within Germany Location within Brandenburg
- Coordinates: 51°52′N 14°25′E
- Country: Germany
- State: Brandenburg
- District: Spree-Neiße
- Seat: Peitz
- Subdivisions: 8 municipalities

Area
  - Total: 284.62 km^{2} (109.89 sq mi)

Population (2025-12-31)
  - Total: 10,505
  - Density: 36.909/km^{2} (95.594/sq mi)
- Time zone: UTC+01:00 (CET)
  - Summer (DST): UTC+02:00 (CEST)
- Website: www.peitz.de

Amt Peitz (Lower Sorbian: Amt Picnjo) is an Amt ("collective municipality") in the district of Spree-Neiße, in Brandenburg, Germany. Its seat is in Peitz (Picnjo).

The Amt Peitz consists of the following municipalities:

1. Drachhausen
2. Drehnow
3. Heinersbrück
4. Jänschwalde
5. Peitz
6. Tauer
7. Teichland
8. Turnow-Preilack

== Demography ==
Development of population since 1875 within the current Boundaries (Blue Line: Population; Dotted Line: Comparison to Population development in Brandenburg state; Grey Background: Time of Nazi Germany; Red Background: Time of communist East Germany)

Recent Population Development and Projections (Population Development before Census 2011 (blue line); Recent Population Development according to the Census in Germany in 2011 (blue bordered line); Official projections for 2005-2030 (yellow line); for 2017-2030 (scarlet line); for 2020-2030 (green line)

Amt Peitz: Population development
within the current boundaries (2020)

Year	Pop.	±% p.a.
1875	10,966	—
1890	12,437	+0.84%
1910	13,150	+0.28%
1925	11,846	−0.69%
1939	12,265	+0.25%
1950	15,334	+2.05%
1964	13,929	−0.68%
1971	13,577	−0.36%
1981	14,986	+0.99%

Year	Pop.	±% p.a.
1985	14,328	−1.12%
1990	13,994	−0.47%
1995	14,643	+0.91%
2000	13,952	−0.96%
2005	12,577	−2.05%
2010	11,527	−1.73%
2015	10,961	−1.00%
2020	10,678	−0.52%
2025	10,505	−0.33%
