= Nils Miatke =

German footballer (born 1990)

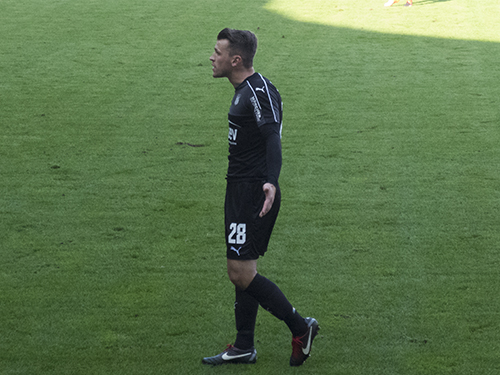

Personal information
- Date of birth: 30 January 1990 (age 36)
- Place of birth: Drachhausen, East Germany
- Height: 1.76 m (5 ft 9 in)
- Position: Midfielder

Team information
- Current team: ZFC Meuselwitz
- Number: 28

Youth career
- 1996–2000: SV Drachhausen
- 2000–2008: FC Energie Cottbus

Senior career*
Years	Team	Apps	(Gls)
2008–2011	Energie Cottbus II	35	(2)
2009–2011	Energie Cottbus	14	(0)
2011–2012	Carl Zeiss Jena	34	(2)
2012–2016	Erzgebirge Aue	35	(0)
2016–2021	FSV Zwickau	138	(6)
2021–	ZFC Meuselwitz	75	(2)
- * Club domestic league appearances and goals as of 24 April 2024

Nils Miatke (born 30 January 1990) is a German footballer who plays as a midfielder for ZFC Meuselwitz.

== Club career ==
=== Energie Cottbus ===
Miatke was born in Drachhausen. He came up through the youth academy at Energie Cottbus, entering the club's system at the age of 10 and graduating to the senior team at the age of 19. He made his competitive debut for the senior team on 1 August 2009 in a 3–1 away victory over Magdeburg in the DFB-Pokal. He made his league debut for the club just eight days later in a 3–1 home victory over Augsburg. He was subbed off for Mariusz Kukiełka in the 87th minute.

=== Carl Zeiss Jena ===
In July 2011, Miatke moved to 3. Liga club Carl Zeiss Jena. He made his competitive debut for the club on 23 July 2011 in a 3–0 away defeat to Rot-Weiß Erfurt. He scored his first competitive goal for the club on 14 September 2011 in a 2–1 away victory over Rot-Weiß Oberhausen. His goal, scored in the 35th minute, made the score 2–0 to Jena.

=== Erzgebirge Aue ===
In July 2012, Miatke signed with 2. Bundesliga club Erzgebirge Aue. On 7 September 2012, Miatke suffered a ruptured cruciate ligament in training. The injury caused him to miss the entire 2012/13 season. He made his competitive debut for the club on 27 July 2013 in a 1–0 home victory over Sandhausen. On 6 March 2015, in the 26th minute of a league match against Ingolstadt, Miatke was subbed off injured. The injury turned out to be a cruciate ligament and meniscus tear in his right knee. He would miss the remainder of that season and almost all of the following one.

=== Zwickau ===
In June 2016, Miatke moved to newly-promoted 3. Liga club FSV Zwickau. He made his competitive debut for the club on 10 August 2016 in a 3–1 away victory over Werder Bremen II. He was subbed off in the 81st minute, being replaced by Christoph Göbel. He scored his first competitive goal for the club on 26 January 2018 in a 2–0 home victory over Sonnenhof Großaspach. His goal, assisted by Bentley Baxter Bahn, was scored in the 22nd minute. On 20 October 2018, Miatke tore the inner band in his knee during training. He was sidelined for six to eight weeks.
