= Jan Chojnan =

Sorbian linguist (1616-1664)

Jan Chojnan (german: Johannes Choinan, latin: Johannes Choinanus) (1616-1664) was a Sorbian linguist and theologian. He had written the oldest known grammar of the Lower Sorbian language and that was a milestone for the creation of the modern Lower Sorbian standard literary language. In the midst of the seventeenth century he used to work as a lutheran priest in Zerkwitz (Lower Sorbian: Cerkwica) near Lübbenau (Lower Sorbian: Lubnjow) where he had created his major work. The Lower Sorbian grammar written in 1650 was based on the dialect spoken in the vicinity of the Cottbus (Lower Sorbian: Chóśebuz) town. Chojnan was also the first known Lower Sorbian author who used simile in the Lower Sorbian literature. There is a commemorative plaque placed in the niche of his church in Zerkwitz (nowadays part of the Lübbenau) and also the street named after him.
