= Teichland =

Teichland Gatojce
- Municipality
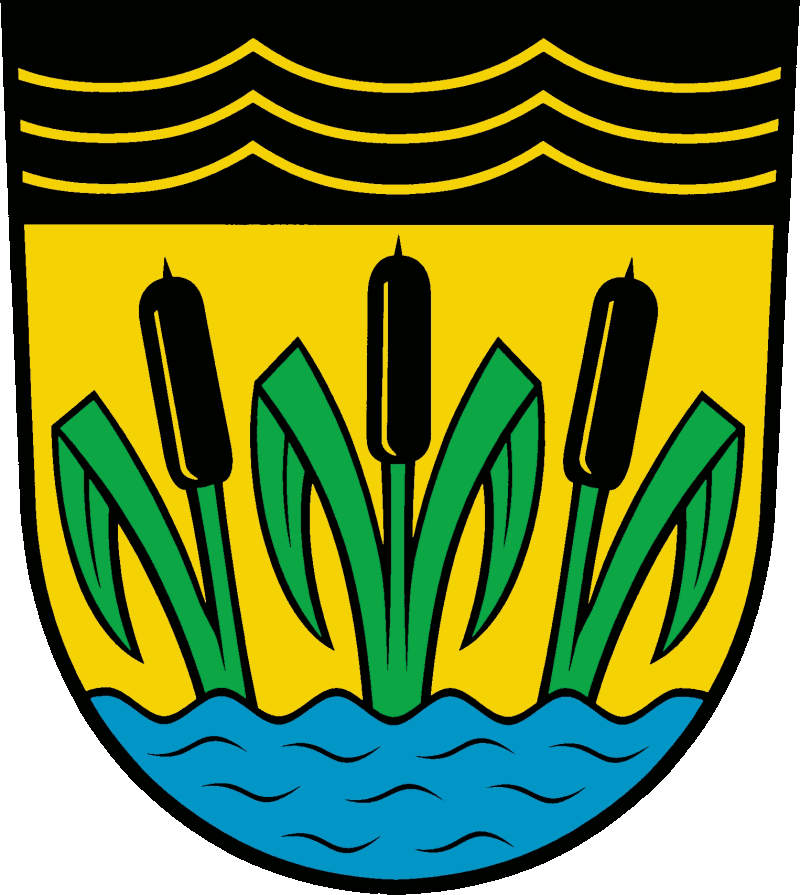
- Coat of arms

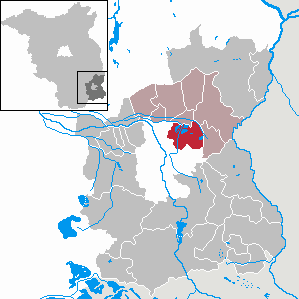
- Location of Teichland within Spree-Neiße district
- Interactive map of Teichland
- Location within Germany Location within Brandenburg
- Coordinates: 51°47′59″N 14°25′00″E
- Country: Germany
- State: Brandenburg
- District: Spree-Neiße
- Municipal assoc.: Peitz
- Subdivisions: 3 Ortsteile

Government
  - Mayor (2024–29): Harald Groba

Area
  - Total: 34.87 km^{2} (13.46 sq mi)
- Elevation: 62 m (203 ft)

Population (2025-12-31)
  - Total: 1,051
  - Density: 30.14/km^{2} (78.06/sq mi)
- Time zone: UTC+01:00 (CET)
  - Summer (DST): UTC+02:00 (CEST)
- Postal codes: 03185
- Dialling codes: 035601
- Vehicle registration: SPN

Teichland (Lower Sorbian: Gatojce, pronounced [ˈɡatɔjtsɛ]) is a municipality in the district of Spree-Neiße, in Lower Lusatia, Brandenburg, Germany.

== History ==
The municipality of Teichland was formed on 31 December 2000 by merging the municipalities of Bärenbrück, Maust and Neuendorf.

From 1815 to 1947, the constituent localities of Teichland were part of the Prussian Province of Brandenburg.

After World War II, Bärenbrück, Maust and Neuendorf were incorporated into the State of Brandenburg from 1947 to 1952 and the Bezirk Cottbus of East Germany from 1952 to 1990. Since 1990, they have been part of Brandenburg, since 2000 united as the municipality of Teichland.

== Demography ==
Development of Population since 1875 within the Current Boundaries (Blue Line: Population; Dotted Line: Comparison to Population Development of Brandenburg state; Grey Background: Time of Nazi rule; Red Background: Time of Communist rule)

Teichland: Population development
within the current boundaries (2013)

| Year | Pop. | ±% p.a. |
|---|---|---|
| 1875 | 839 | — |
| 1890 | 949 | +0.82% |
| 1910 | 1,034 | +0.43% |
| 1925 | 1,021 | −0.08% |
| 1933 | 1,068 | +0.56% |
| 1939 | 1,047 | −0.33% |
| 1946 | 1,265 | +2.74% |
| 1950 | 1,148 | −2.40% |
| 1964 | 1,043 | −0.68% |
| 1971 | 975 | −0.96% |
| 1981 | 817 | −1.75% |
| 1985 | 776 | −1.28% |
| 1989 | 781 | +0.16% |
| 1990 | 775 | −0.77% |
| 1991 | 761 | −1.81% |
| 1992 | 751 | −1.31% |
| 1993 | 766 | +2.00% |
| 1994 | 844 | +10.18% |
| 1995 | 952 | +12.80% |
| 1996 | 1,052 | +10.50% |

| Year | Pop. | ±% p.a. |
|---|---|---|
| 1997 | 1,099 | +4.47% |
| 1998 | 1,197 | +8.92% |
| 1999 | 1,270 | +6.10% |
| 2000 | 1,299 | +2.28% |
| 2001 | 1,310 | +0.85% |
| 2002 | 1,304 | −0.46% |
| 2003 | 1,294 | −0.77% |
| 2004 | 1,290 | −0.31% |
| 2005 | 1,270 | −1.55% |
| 2006 | 1,242 | −2.20% |
| 2007 | 1,233 | −0.72% |
| 2008 | 1,228 | −0.41% |
| 2009 | 1,192 | −2.93% |
| 2010 | 1,171 | −1.76% |
| 2011 | 1,186 | +1.28% |
| 2012 | 1,176 | −0.84% |
| 2013 | 1,175 | −0.09% |
| 2014 | 1,155 | −1.70% |
| 2015 | 1,150 | −0.43% |
| 2016 | 1,143 | −0.61% |
