= Drehnow =

Drehnow Drjenow
- Municipality
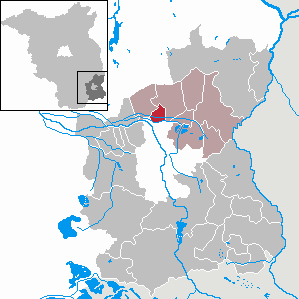
- Location of Drehnow within Spree-Neiße district
- Interactive map of Drehnow
- Location within Germany Location within Brandenburg
- Coordinates: 51°52′00″N 14°22′00″E
- Country: Germany
- State: Brandenburg
- District: Spree-Neiße
- Municipal assoc.: Peitz

Government
  - Mayor (2024–29): Markus Erb

Area
  - Total: 10.95 km^{2} (4.23 sq mi)
- Elevation: 61 m (200 ft)

Population (2025-12-31)
  - Total: 503
  - Density: 45.9/km^{2} (119/sq mi)
- Time zone: UTC+01:00 (CET)
  - Summer (DST): UTC+02:00 (CEST)
- Postal codes: 03185
- Dialling codes: 035601
- Vehicle registration: SPN
- Website: www.Drehnow.de

Drehnow (Lower Sorbian: Drjenow, pronounced [ˈdrʲɛnɔw]) is a municipality in the district of Spree-Neiße, in Lower Lusatia, Brandenburg, Germany.

== History ==
From 1815 to 1947, Drehnow was part of the Prussian Province of Brandenburg.

After World War II, Drehnow was incorporated into the State of Brandenburg from 1947 to 1952 and the Bezirk Cottbus of East Germany from 1952 to 1990. Since 1990, Drehnow has been part of Brandenburg.

== Demography ==
Development of Population since 1875 within the Current Boundaries (Blue Line: Population; Dotted Line: Comparison to Population Development of Brandenburg state; Grey Background: Time of Nazi rule; Red Background: Time of Communist rule)

Drehnow: Population development
within the current boundaries (2013)

Year	Pop.	±% p.a.
1875	666	—
1890	727	+0.59%
1910	703	−0.17%
1925	691	−0.11%
1933	715	+0.43%
1939	722	+0.16%
1946	888	+3.00%
1950	839	−1.41%
1964	712	−1.17%
1971	682	−0.61%
1981	638	−0.66%
1985	644	+0.23%
1989	625	−0.75%
1990	617	−1.28%
1991	626	+1.46%
1992	630	+0.64%
1993	640	+1.59%
1994	634	−0.94%
1995	641	+1.10%
1996	668	+4.21%

Year	Pop.	±% p.a.
1997	674	+0.90%
1998	676	+0.30%
1999	667	−1.33%
2000	663	−0.60%
2001	653	−1.51%
2002	648	−0.77%
2003	638	−1.54%
2004	635	−0.47%
2005	620	−2.36%
2006	616	−0.65%
2007	606	−1.62%
2008	587	−3.14%
2009	583	−0.68%
2010	578	−0.86%
2011	571	−1.21%
2012	548	−4.03%
2013	546	−0.36%
2014	548	+0.37%
2015	550	+0.36%
2016	538	−2.18%
