= Tauer =

Tauer Turjej
- Municipality
- Coat of arms

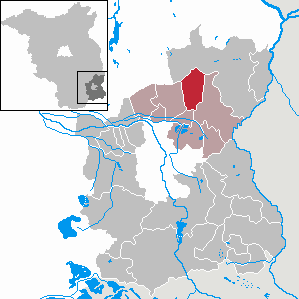
- Location of Tauer within Spree-Neiße district
- Interactive map of Tauer
- Location within Germany Location within Brandenburg
- Coordinates: 51°54′N 14°27′E
- Country: Germany
- State: Brandenburg
- District: Spree-Neiße
- Municipal assoc.: Peitz

Government
  - Mayor (2024–29): Karin Kallauke

Area
  - Total: 41.91 km^{2} (16.18 sq mi)
- Elevation: 61 m (200 ft)

Population (2025-12-31)
  - Total: 677
  - Density: 16.2/km^{2} (41.8/sq mi)
- Time zone: UTC+01:00 (CET)
  - Summer (DST): UTC+02:00 (CEST)
- Postal codes: 03185
- Dialling codes: 035601
- Vehicle registration: SPN

Tauer (Sorbian: Turjej) is a municipality in the district of Spree-Neiße, in Lower Lusatia, Brandenburg, Germany.

== History ==
The area is known to have been settled as early as the Bronze Age. The first written mention was in 1632 as Tawern Tauer. In 1652, it was known as the village of Taurow. From 1815 to 1947, Tauer was part of the Prussian Province of Brandenburg. From 1952 to 1990, it was part of the Bezirk Cottbus of East Germany.

== Demography ==
Development of Population since 1875 within the Current Boundaries (Blue Line: Population; Dotted Line: Comparison to Population Development of Brandenburg state; Grey Background: Time of Nazi rule; Red Background: Time of Communist rule)

Tauer: Population development
within the current boundaries (2017)

Year	Pop.	±% p.a.
1875	948	—
1890	971	+0.16%
1910	1,043	+0.36%
1925	1,027	−0.10%
1933	986	−0.51%
1939	954	−0.55%
1946	1,316	+4.70%
1950	1,244	−1.40%
1964	964	−1.80%
1971	919	−0.68%
1981	817	−1.17%
1985	772	−1.41%
1989	740	−1.05%
1990	749	+1.22%

Year	Pop.	±% p.a.
1991	739	−1.34%
1992	730	−1.22%
1993	734	+0.55%
1994	742	+1.09%
1995	758	+2.16%
1996	764	+0.79%
1997	787	+3.01%
1998	816	+3.68%
1999	830	+1.72%
2000	818	−1.45%
2001	820	+0.24%
2002	809	−1.34%
2003	797	−1.48%
2004	804	+0.88%

Year	Pop.	±% p.a.
2005	805	+0.12%
2006	804	−0.12%
2007	792	−1.49%
2008	787	−0.63%
2009	762	−3.18%
2010	751	−1.44%
2011	745	−0.80%
2012	739	−0.81%
2013	728	−1.49%
2014	719	−1.24%
2015	709	−1.39%
2016	698	−1.55%
2017	694	−0.57%
