= Lower Sorbian language =

West Slavic language of eastern Germany

Lower Sorbian
- dolnoserbšćina, dolnoserbski
- Pronunciation: [ˈdɔlnɔˌsɛrskʲi]
- Native to: Germany
- Region: Brandenburg
- Ethnicity: Sorbs
- Native speakers: 5,000 (2010)
- Language family: Indo-European: Balto-Slavic; Slavic; West Slavic; Sorbian; Lower Sorbian
- Dialects: Schleifer
- Writing system: Latin (Sorbian alphabet)

Official status
- Regulated by: Lower Sorbian Language Commission (Dolnoserbska rěcna komisija, DSRK)

Language codes
- ISO 639-2: dsb
- ISO 639-3: dsb
- Glottolog: lowe1385
- ELP: Lower Sorbian
- Linguasphere: 53-AAA-ba < 53-AAA-b < 53-AAA-b...-d (varieties: 53-AAA-baa to 53-AAA-bah)
- Area of Sorbian languages in Germany

Lower Sorbian (endonym: dolnoserbšćina) is a West Slavic minority language spoken in eastern Germany in the historical province of Lower Lusatia, today part of Brandenburg.

Standard Lower Sorbian is one of the two literary Sorbian languages, the other being the more widely spoken Upper Sorbian. The Lower Sorbian literary standard was developed in the 18th century, based on a southern form of the Cottbus dialect. The standard variety of Lower Sorbian has received structural influence from Upper Sorbian. Lower Sorbian differs from Upper Sorbian at all levels of the language system: in phonetics (the spread of the plosive consonant g; the merger of the affricate č with the hardened fricative c; the change of hard r after p, t, k into hard š; the change of ć, ʒ́ into soft fricative sibilants ś, ź), in morphology (the presence of the supine; absence of aorist and imperfect forms in dialects), and in vocabulary (bom "tree"; twarc "carpenter"; gluka "happiness" and so on, contrasted with the corresponding Upper Sorbian štom, ćěsla, zbožo). The formation of the Lower Sorbian literary norm was greatly influenced by the Upper Sorbian language. Unlike Upper Sorbian, Lower Sorbian is less standardized and strictly codified, characterized by instability and greater variability.

Lower Sorbian is spoken in and around the city of Cottbus in Brandenburg. Signs in this region are typically bilingual, and Cottbus has a Lower Sorbian Gymnasium where one language of instruction is Lower Sorbian. It is a heavily endangered language. Most native speakers today belong to the older generations. The younger and middle generations only know the learned literary language, with German being their native language. The assimilation process in Lower Lusatia has reached such a level that one can speak of a threat to the existence of the Lower Sorbian language.

A writing system based on the Latin alphabet was created in the 16th century. The first grammar of the language in history was written in 1650 by the Lutheran pastor Jan Hoinan. The regulator of the literary language is the Lower Sorbian Language Commission, currently operating under the Sorbian cultural and educational society Matica serbska.

== History ==
=== Pre-literary period ===
The modern Lower Sorbian dialects developed on the basis of Proto-Slavic dialects whose speakers, by the 6th–7th centuries, had occupied extensive territories on the western periphery of the Slavic linguistic area — in the middle course of the Elbe, from the Oder in the east to the Saale in the west. The early beginning of the expansion of the German language led to the assimilation of the Slavic dialects over a significant part of the ancient Lusatian area. Only a small portion of the territory where the Old Sorbian dialects were spoken has survived to the present day — Lower Sorbian dialects in the area of the Lusici tribe, and Upper Sorbian dialects in the area of the Milceni tribe.

The Sorbs never had their own statehood. For a long time, the alliance of Lusatian Serb tribes resisted German aggression and even went on the offensive, invading Frankish lands and devastating them. Nevertheless, in the 10th century the Sorbian tribal alliance was finally defeated, and the Slavic population fell under German rule. From the late 10th century onwards, for an entire millennium, the Sorbian linguistic area lay within various German-speaking states or their administrative units. This became the main reason for the gradual Germanization of the Sorbian population. Germanization in Lusatia varied in time and intensity, sometimes taking a natural course, sometimes being coercive. The result was the narrowing of the sphere of Sorbian dialect use to mainly oral everyday communication, their gradual displacement from towns into rural areas, and the shrinking of the Sorbian area almost to the point of disappearance today.

In the 13th–15th centuries, significant changes to the ethnolinguistic map of Sorbian territory were caused by a period of internal colonization. German settlers founded new villages; the Sorbs became a minority among the numerically dominant German-speaking population and gradually lost their native language, adopting German. The Sorbian linguistic area was greatly reduced, and many Slavic territories — including a number of peripheral districts of Lower Lusatia — became German-speaking. The urban population spoke German; Sorbian dialects were used mainly in the villages. At the same time, population growth and the founding of new settlements, especially in the 13th century, led to the formation of a compact Sorbian-speaking area within what is now Lower and Upper Lusatia.

Until the 16th century, the rural population of Lower Lusatia was almost entirely Sorbian; only after the Reformation did the number of Sorbs begin to decline while the German population grew. German–Sorbian bilingualism spread in different ways across districts, towns, and villages. The process was faster in peripheral areas, slower around Cottbus. Sorbs in towns were quickly Germanized; the process was slower in suburbs and slowest in villages. Until the late 18th century, Sorbian dialects remained the main means of communication for the peasantry, with German being only a second language in villages. Until the mid-16th century, the functions of the Sorbian dialects were limited mainly to oral communication within the family; they were used to a limited extent in courts (for giving testimony, though it was recorded in German), in church practice (for oral translation from German into Sorbian), and in communications from the authorities to the population.

=== Literary period ===
The first monuments of written Lower Sorbian appeared by the 16th century, in the era of the Reformation. The reformed church needed to translate liturgical books into a language understandable to parishioners. Early translations were made in different Sorbian regions for the needs of local churches, in local dialects. Due to the dominance of German in all spheres of urban life, the general illiteracy of the rural Lusatian population, and dialectal fragmentation (translations in one Sorbian dialect were not accepted by writers in another), these texts were not widely distributed. Differences in the historical development of the various Sorbian dialects, in the economic and political importance of different Sorbian regions, in the attitudes of various German feudal authorities toward the Sorbian language, the absence of a unified Sorbian cultural center, unified secular and church authority, a unified school system, and the predominance of German-speakers in towns all hindered Sorbian ethno-linguistic integration.

As a result, in the absence of supra-regional linguistic forms during the pre-literary period (from the 16th century to the second half of the 17th century), church writing developed independently in Lower and Upper Lusatia. A distinctive feature of Lower Sorbian literary development was that the first Sorbian texts appeared not in the center of Lower Lusatia but in its periphery. Translations made in the north of Lower Lusatia continued to appear even after the interruption caused by the Thirty Years’ War, in the 1650s–1660s. But by order of the Elector of Brandenburg, all books and manuscripts in Lower Sorbian were either confiscated or destroyed, and Sorbian-language worship was banned. Thus, the emerging Sorbian cultural center in northern Lower Lusatia ceased to exist, and the preconditions for the rise of a Lower Sorbian literary language in the north were eliminated.

In the last decades of the 17th century, a new stage began in the development of Lower Sorbian writing and the formation of the Lower Sorbian literary language, centered in the Cottbus district (where the German population made up only 10–15% of the total). Sorbian was the main means of oral communication in the district (especially among the rural population); it was already used as a liturgical language and, in the 18th century, began to be used in teaching in village schools. In the late 17th and throughout the 18th century, thanks to local clergy (both Sorbian and German), translations of church texts into Lower Sorbian were made in Cottbus and its surroundings. Gradually, the Cottbus dialect became a model for the rest of Lower Lusatia. However, policies toward Sorbian varied: in the Cottbus area the language was not persecuted, but in the rest of the Margraviate of Lower Lusatia a consistent policy of eradication was pursued.

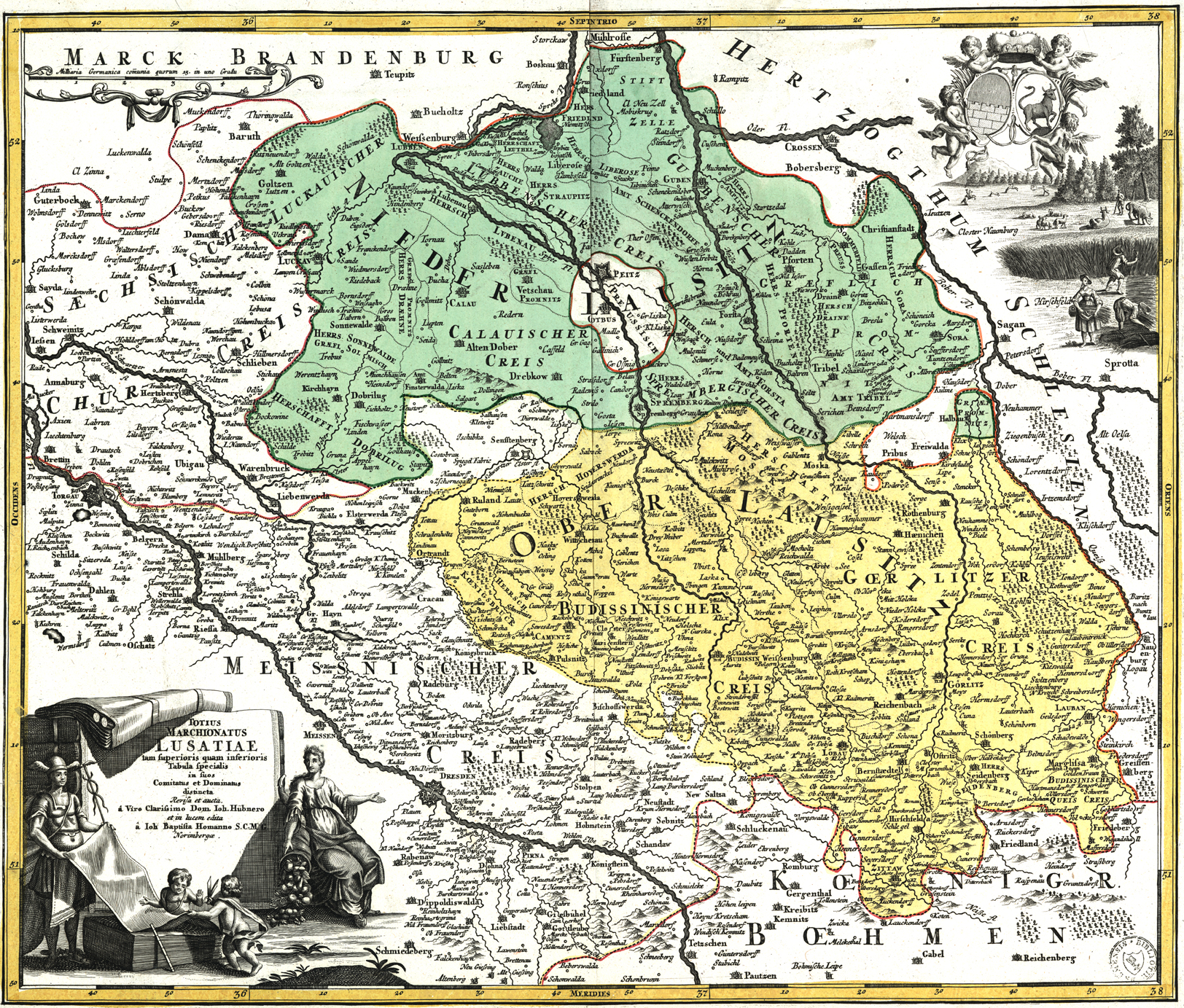
Map of Lower and Upper Lusatia in the 18th century

The formation of the Lower Sorbian literary norm is usually dated to the publication, on the initiative of pastor G. Fabricius, of translations of Martin Luther's Catechism (1706) and the New Testament (1709). These were based on the Kocjebuz (Cottbus) dialect. In 1796 J. B. Fritz translated the Old Testament into this dialect. Attempts to create writing in the Cottbus region had also been made in the 17th century, notably by Jan Chojnan, author of a handwritten grammar. But by order of the authorities, many Sorbian manuscripts were destroyed — not only in Brandenburg but also in Saxony. Some surviving early texts were published in the 19th–20th centuries. Thanks to reprints of Fabricius's New Testament, the Cottbus dialect — described by him as the most suitable for a literary language (“the most elegant and precise”) — spread to the rest of Lower Lusatia.

In its early stage, written Lower Sorbian vocabulary consisted mainly of church terms (in the absence of secular literature), with many German borrowings and calques, hybrid formations combining German and Sorbian morphemes, no influence from other Slavic languages, unstable spelling, and inconsistent fixation of certain forms and features.

From 1815, by decision of the Congress of Vienna, Lower Lusatia became part of the Frankfurt administrative district of the Prussian province of Brandenburg. The political situation was less favorable for the Lower Sorbs than for the Upper Sorbs, since the Prussian authorities favored assimilation of Slavic peoples, unlike Saxony, which now included Upper Lusatia. In the 19th century, the main sphere of written Lower Sorbian was church life, to some extent schooling and domestic use; only a small local intelligentsia used it actively. Limited domains of use, lack of secular writing, and mass illiteracy led to a gradual divergence between the written language and popular speech, especially as Sorbs often used German outside the family and church. During the national revival from the mid-19th century, the emerging popular movement aimed to preserve the Sorbian people, to spread the Sorbian language, develop and perfect it, and grant it equal rights with German. Sorbs created cultural and scholarly societies (including Matica), published newspapers and books in their language, and promoted public education. On the one hand, the prestige and scope of Sorbian grew; on the other, in conditions of Germanization — with Sorbs required to learn German in school, the army, and Protestant churches — bilingualism spread quickly, and the number of Sorbian speakers began to decline, especially in Protestant areas of Lower and Upper Lusatia (the more cohesive Catholic Sorbs preserved their language better). Unlike the relatively more developed Upper Sorbian, the Lower Sorbian literary language remained mostly limited to church literature; secular literature, which appeared from the 1860s, was mainly translations from Upper Sorbian. Prussian minority policy almost halted publishing in Lower Lusatia, restricted Sorbian in church life, and from the 1840s banned it in schools. The lack of unified Sorbian administration, church, and schooling, along with early dialect differences, hindered the unification of Lower and Upper Sorbian literary norms. By the 19th century, many activists already understood that merging the two languages was unlikely.

In 1937–1945, Sorbian was banned in Germany. All Sorbian organizations, publishers, and presses were closed; Sorbian intellectuals were persecuted. There were attempts to completely replace Sorbian with German, even in the home. The ban hit Protestant areas hardest, including all of Lower Lusatia, which is entirely Protestant.

After World War II, the position of German strengthened again due to the resettlement of Germans from eastern territories — from Poland, the Czech lands, and elsewhere — into Lusatia. In the GDR, the Sorbs were not given autonomy; their settlement area was divided among administrative units. Still, Sorbian was recognized as equal with German, used more actively in public life, and to a limited extent in administration. Sorbs were granted cultural autonomy, Sorbian-language schools, a teachers’ college, a theatre, folk ensembles, a folk culture festival, and increased publishing. Nonetheless, the number of speakers kept declining in both the GDR and unified Germany. Sorbs continued to shift to German under its dominance in the media, public life, education, labour migration, industry, and mixed marriages. In these conditions, mixed Sorbian–German villages emerged, including in Lower Lusatia; in many districts, Sorbian has disappeared or is now on the brink of extinction.

Since 1992, the monthly television program Łužyca has been broadcast in Lower Sorbian — from 1992 to 2003 by the Brandenburg public broadcaster ORB, and since 2003 by RBB. RBB's Cottbus studio also produces several Lower Sorbian radio programs.

=== Historical phonetics ===
- As in Polish and Czech, both Proto-Slavic reduced vowels became e in a strong position. Full vowels preceding a reduced vowel in a weak position were lengthened after the loss of the reduced vowels. Over time, vowel length distinctions were lost, and stress became fixed on the first syllable (Proto-Slavic had free stress).
- According to J. Nalepa, nasal vowels disappeared in Lusatian in the second half of the 12th century, probably under Czech influence.
- The affricate ʒ, as in most other Slavic languages, simplified to z: mjeza (Pol. miedza) “boundary.”
- As in Polish and early Kashubian, soft dentals ť and ď became affricates ć and dź; this shift was phonologized by the 13th century. Later, in Lower Sorbian, these affricates lost their stop element: ć > ś, dź > ź, except after dental fricatives (rjeśaz “chain,” daś “give,” kosć “bone,” źiwy “wild,” měź “copper,” pozdźej “later” vs. Upper Sorbian rjećaz, dać, kosć, dźiwi, mjedź, pozdźe). This change took place in the mid-16th century in western dialects and about a century later in eastern ones, not affecting transitional central dialects or the Mužakow and Slepian dialects.
- Soft c’, z’, s’ hardened; if followed by i, it became y: ducy “going,” syła “strength,” zyma “winter” (cf. Czech jdoucí, síla, zima). This change likely occurred in the early 15th century. A similar change (in Lower but not Upper Sorbian) affected soft č’, ž’, š’ by the early 16th century: cysty “clean,” šyja “neck,” žywy “alive” (vs. Upper Sorbian čisty, šija, žiwy).
- By the mid-16th century, č became c: cas “time,” pcoła “bee” (Upper Sorbian čas, pčoła), except in the suffix -učki and after fricatives. Č also remains in loanwords and onomatopoeic words.
- After consonants p, t, k, the sounds r and r’ became ř and ř’; then in Lower Sorbian, ř > š, ř’ > ć (later ś): pšawy “right,” tśi “three.”
- As in Polish, hard ł became the bilabial w (first written attestations in the 17th c.), and soft ľ not before front vowels acquired “European” alveolar articulation (like in German).
- w disappeared in initial gw- and xw- clusters (Old Slavic gvozdь > gozd “dry forest,” xvoščь > chošć “horsetail”), at the beginning of a word before a consonant, and after a consonant before u. This process began before the 13th century and ended by the 16th. Soft w’ became j between vowels, before a consonant, and finally: rukajca “glove” (Pol. rękawica), mužoju/mužeju “to a man” (Pol. mężowi), kšej “blood” (Pol. krew).
- e became a after soft consonants and before hard ones: brjaza “birch,” kolaso “wheel,” pjac “bake,” lažaś “lie,” pjas “dog” (Upper Sorbian brěza, koleso, pjec, ležeć, pos). This change was complete by the mid-17th century and did not affect the Muskau and Slepian dialects.

== Linguistic geography ==
=== Area and number of speakers ===
Lower Sorbian is spoken in the historical region of Lower Lusatia in the eastern part of Germany, on a small territory around the city of Cottbus. In terms of modern administrative division, Lower Sorbian-speaking areas are located in the southeast of the federal state of Brandenburg.

According to the “Law on the Rights of Lusatian Sorbs/Wends in Brandenburg” of 7 July 1994, the settlement area of the Brandenburg Sorbs, in which the cultural and linguistic tradition of the Sorbs has been preserved to this day and where the rights of the Lower Sorbian language are guaranteed, includes:

- the free city of Cottbus (Chóśebuz),

and a number of municipalities in three districts:

- Spree-Neisse district (22 of 30 municipalities): Briesen (Brjazyna), Burg (Bórkowy), Dissen-Striesow (Dešno-Strjažow), Drachhausen (Hochoza), Drebkau (Drjowk), Drehnow (Drjenow), Felixsee (Feliksowy jazor) — only the settlement of Bloischdorf (Błobošojce), Forst (Forst / Baršć) — only the settlement of Horno (Rogow), Guhrow (Góry), Heinersbrück (Móst), Hornow-Wadelsdorf (Lěšće-Zakrjejc), Jänschwalde (Janšojce), Kolkwitz (Gołkojce), Peitz (Picnjo), Schmogrow-Fehrow (Smogorjow-Prjawoz), Spremberg (Grodk), Tauer (Turjej), Teichland (Gatojce), Turnow-Preilack (Turnow-Pśiłuk), Welzow (Wjelcej) — only the settlement of Proschim (Prožym), Werben (Wjerbno), and Wiesengrund (Łukojce) — only the settlement of Mattendorf (Matyjojce).
- Dahme-Spreewald district (3 of 37 municipalities): Byhleguhre-Byhlen (Běła Góra-Bělin), Neu Zauche (Nowa Niwa), and Straupitz (Tšupc).
- Oberspreewald-Lausitz district (2 of 25 municipalities): Lübbenau (Lubnjow) and Vetschau (Wětošow).

The total number of Lower Sorbian speakers is estimated at between 6,400 and 8,000 people, mostly elderly. The number of active speakers is likely even smaller. According to Ethnologue (2007), there were 6,860 speakers; according to research by the Sorbian Institute (2009), the number was between 6,400 and 7,000. Languages of the World: Slavic Languages (2005) notes that no more than 8,000 people know Lower Sorbian, and for only about 3,000 of them (mainly over 70 years old) it is their native language in dialect form. In 2024, a study by the University of Leipzig identified 50 to 100 speakers of Lower Sorbian who were certified as having a proficient level of competence in the language.

=== Sociolinguistic information ===
As part of the Sorbian linguistic area, Lower Sorbian is officially recognized in Germany as the language of an indigenous minority and enjoys the right to state support. The rights of the Sorbs to use their language and develop their culture are enshrined in Article 35 and Note 14 of the Treaty on German Reunification, and additionally — in the constitution and the Law on the Rights of Lusatian Sorbs of Brandenburg.

=== §8 of the Law on the Rights of Lusatian Sorbs/Wends in Brandenburg (7 July 1994) states ===
1. The Land recognizes the Sorbian languages, in particular Lower Sorbian, as part of its spiritual and cultural wealth and welcomes their use. Their use is free. Oral and written use in public life will be protected and promoted.
2. In the traditional settlement area, every resident has the right to use Lower Sorbian in dealings with Land authorities, public-law institutions, and municipal administrations. Exercising this right has the same consequences as using German. Replies and decisions can be given in Lower Sorbian. Residents must not bear any costs or disadvantages in connection with this.

The law guarantees the free use of Lower Sorbian on equal terms with German, state support for research, the right of children to learn their mother tongue in preschool and school, teacher training, bilingual signage (on public buildings, street signs, road and place names), and support for Lower Sorbian media.

The linguistic situation in the Lower Sorbian area is similar to that in Upper Lusatia: historically, there has been increasing contact between Sorbs and Germans. By the early 20th century, Sorbs were bilingual, but over the 20th century, Sorbian was gradually replaced by German, especially in Lower Lusatia, where German-Sorbian mixed populations live. Transmission of Lower Sorbian to younger generations has largely ceased.

If in the Catholic areas of Upper Lusatia representatives of all generations of Sorbs speak the Sorbian language, and in addition the German population also knows Sorbian (passively or even actively), then in Lower Lusatia and in the Protestant areas of Upper Lusatia Sorbian speakers are a minority, and the main means of communication is German, the official language of Germany, and Germans do not know Sorbian. The older and middle generations of Sorbs in these areas speak both Sorbian and German fluently (without a Sorbian accent). German influence on Sorbian manifests itself at all levels of the language system. The younger generation either does not know Sorbian at all or knows it to a limited degree, including passively. Sorbs in Lower Lusatia have limited familiarity with the press, Sorbian literature is practically unknown, German or alternately German and Lower Sorbian is used at work, few can read in Lower Sorbian, and church services have not been held for a long time. The main speakers of Lower Sorbian are rural residents who know the language mainly in dialect form. The literary language is used by a small number of urban or rural intellectuals who learned it at school. There is an increasing degree of German interference in Lower Sorbian.

The main sphere of use of Lower Sorbian at present is everyday communication in the family, with friends and acquaintances, at family celebrations, sometimes (alongside German) in the work environment, during official and business contacts (mainly at events of Sorbian organizations), and in church. In all other spheres of communication Sorbs use German, which they command at all stylistic levels (both the literary language and often local dialects).

Lower Sorbian exists in several forms: as the written form of the literary language, as the oral form of the literary language, as a colloquial supraregional form close to the dialects, also used in private correspondence, and as local dialects. The literary language is spoken mainly by representatives of the Sorbian intelligentsia, while the majority of the other Lower Sorbian speakers know the language in its dialect form. For historical reasons, the literary norm does not serve a unifying role for Lower Sorbian dialects. It has never had official status, was rarely used in education, and has always been applied in a limited way; furthermore, the literary norm is conservative, having diverged significantly from the dialects due to purist tendencies and efforts at re-Slavicization in the past, as well as under the influence of Upper Sorbian. The increase in prestige of the literary language in the postwar period as a result of expanding its spheres of use did not have a significant impact on the language situation. Most people who know the literary language live in Cottbus — the cultural center of Lower Lusatia — and part of the Lower Sorbian intelligentsia also knows Upper Sorbian. The active use of the literary norm (both written and oral) in Cottbus is supported by its functioning in the city's Sorbian political, scientific, and cultural organizations, and in the mass media — official speeches, the publication of scientific works, newspapers, magazines, and the production of radio and television programs. The intelligentsia of all generations command the literary language in both oral and written forms. Often the younger generation learns Lower Sorbian in its literary form as a second language (with German being their native language). The development of the colloquial language is driven by the need for informal communication between people from different dialect regions; it is a spoken, spontaneous form with varying numbers of dialect elements. In rural areas, the main means of communication is the dialects, spoken mainly by the older generation of Sorbs. The dialects are strongly influenced by German, as they are used exclusively in oral communication, have no strict norms, and always function alongside the more prestigious and stylistically developed German language. The dialects are disappearing relatively quickly, particularly in the eastern areas of Lower Lusatia, since the younger generation of Sorbs is not acquiring them.

For the purpose of revitalizing Lower Sorbian, the Witaj program has been introduced in some kindergartens in Lusatia. The main method of implementing this program is constant immersion of children in the Sorbian language environment. There is no school instruction in Lower Sorbian; in some schools mixed German–Sorbian instruction has been introduced, and more often Lower Sorbian is taught in schools only as a subject.

Currently, many researchers note that the Lower Sorbian language is on the verge of extinction, as evidenced by demographic data showing that most active speakers of Lower Sorbian are older people. The trend toward a decline in the number of Lower Sorbian speakers remains unchanged. In particular, UNESCO has included both Sorbian languages in the Atlas of Endangered Languages. Lower Sorbian is often perceived as a language “authorized” to be used within the boundaries of special Sorbian institutions (the Sorbian House and Museum in Cottbus, printed and electronic Sorbian media, schools, the Witaj language center, the church). It is increasingly less often used as a conversational, everyday, unofficial language. At the same time, the Sorbs living in Lower Lusatia themselves consider the prospects for preserving Lower Sorbian to be unlikely. Among the local population of Lusatia, most often among Germans, the opinion is widespread that the Sorbian language and culture are preserved only thanks to large-scale financial support. For example, parents send their children to bilingual kindergartens and schools, which are generally better equipped or offer a wider range of opportunities than German ones.

Overall, Sorbs note that the differences between Lower Sorbian and Upper Sorbian make communication between their speakers difficult; nevertheless, the idea of creating a single Sorbian language at the present stage is considered artificial. An objective reason preventing the unity of the Sorbian ethnic group and the creation of a single language is the administrative–territorial separation of Lower and Upper Lusatia. Matters of Sorbian language and cultural development fall under the jurisdiction of the authorities of Brandenburg and Saxony, who focus only on the Sorbs of their own territory. In particular, the Law on the Rights of the Lusatian Sorbs/Wends in Brandenburg emphasizes that it concerns “the Sorbian language, and especially Lower Sorbian.” Sorbian media likewise focus primarily on their own region. The Sorbs themselves consider the existence of two literary forms of the Sorbian language to be natural and objective. Each of the languages is seen as a cultural treasure preserved by the representatives of a small Slavic people. For this reason, the Sorbs believe it is necessary to support both languages. Often, activists from among the Upper Sorbian community participate in the creation and implementation of projects to study and promote Lower Sorbian.

Various associations and organizations are committed to the preservation and promotion of Lower Sorbian culture and language. In Cottbus, there is also the only Lower Sorbian secondary school (Gymnasium). Since 2023, as part of the structural change project Zorja (“Dawn”), a several-month intensive learning program for 12 participants at a time has been offered in the form of a language nest.

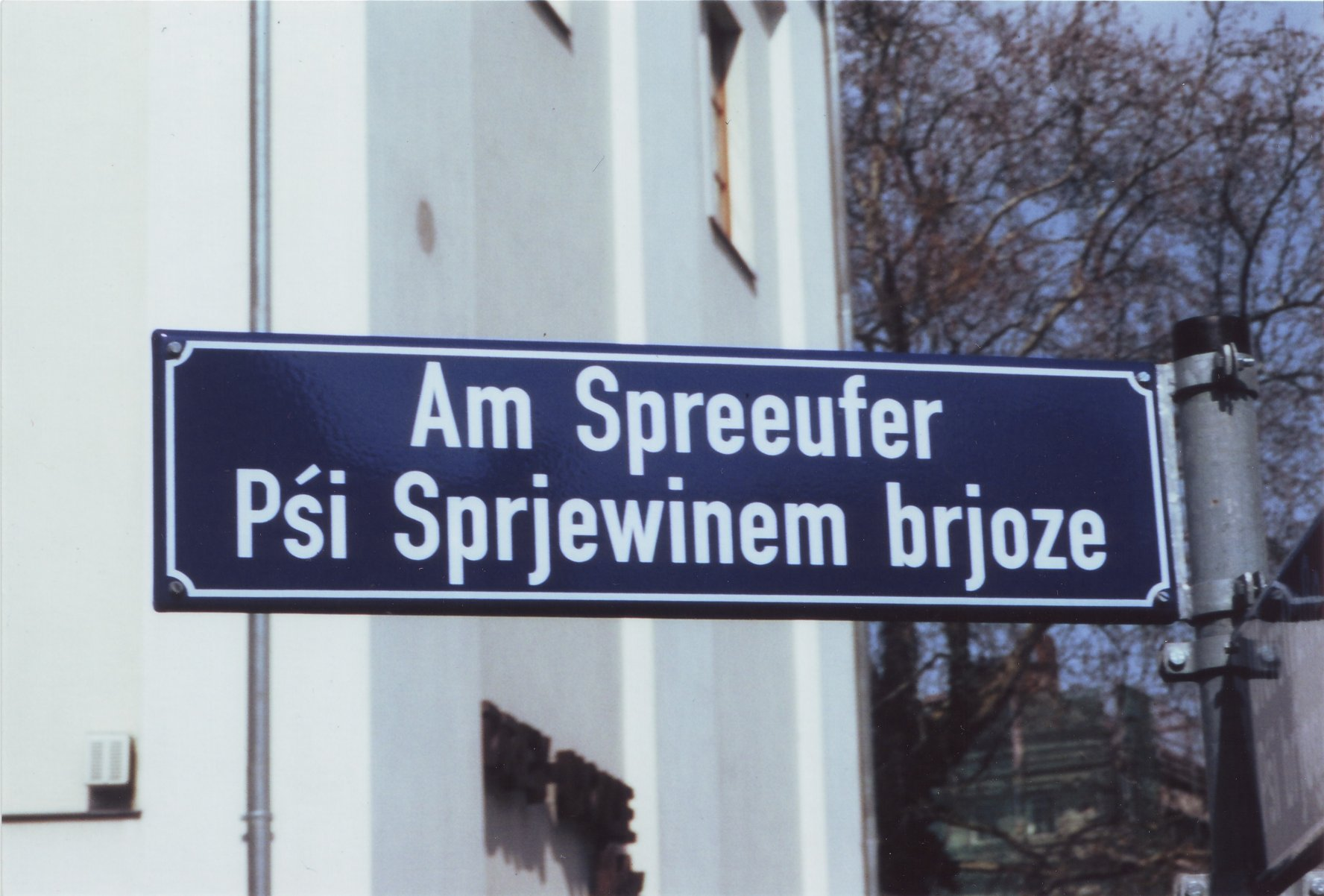
Bilingual signpost on the embankment in Cottbus

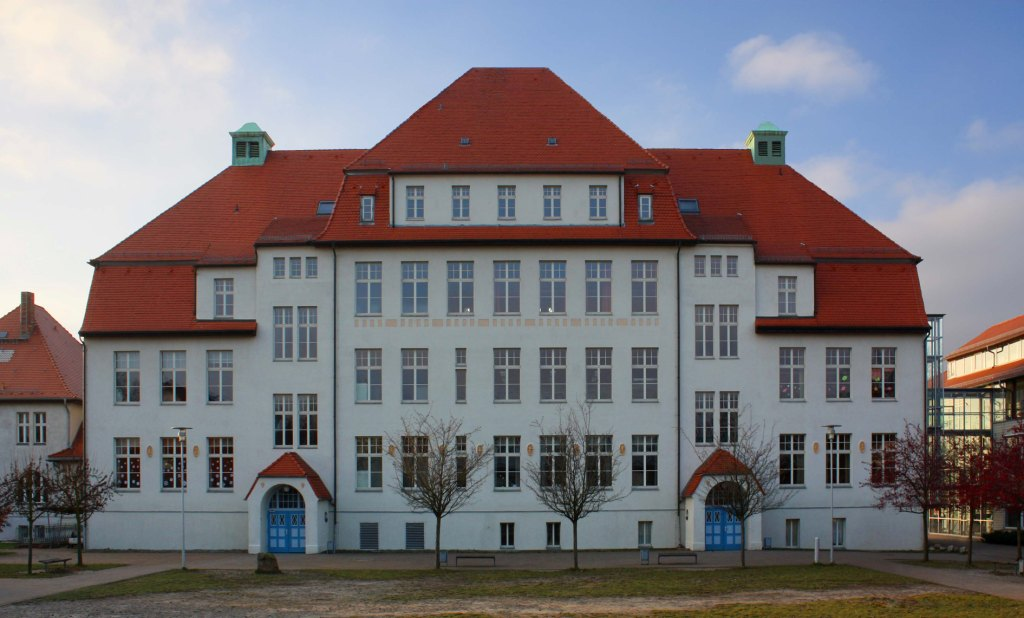
Building of the Lower Sorbian Gymnasium in Cottbus

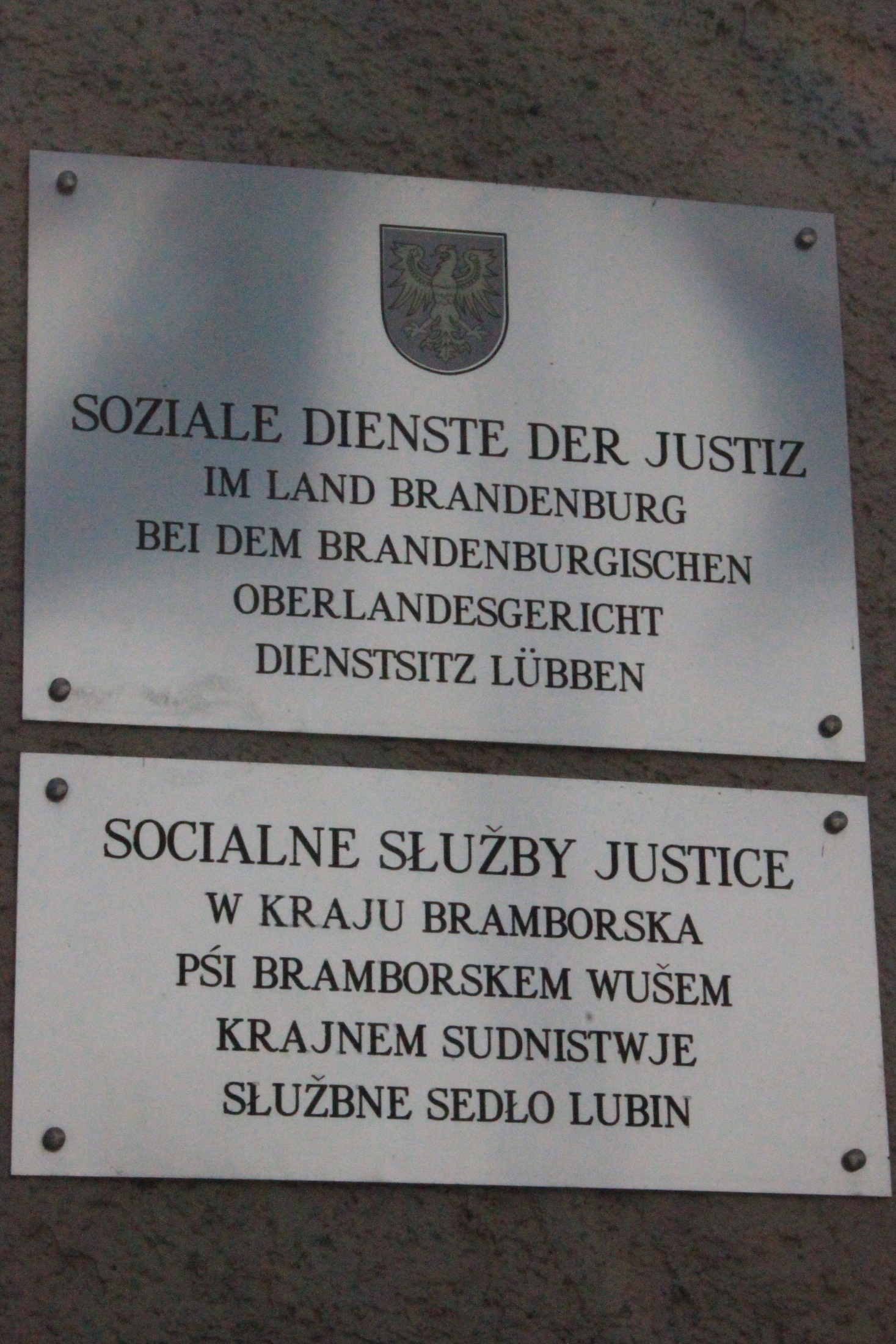
Bilingual sign at the administrative office in Lübben

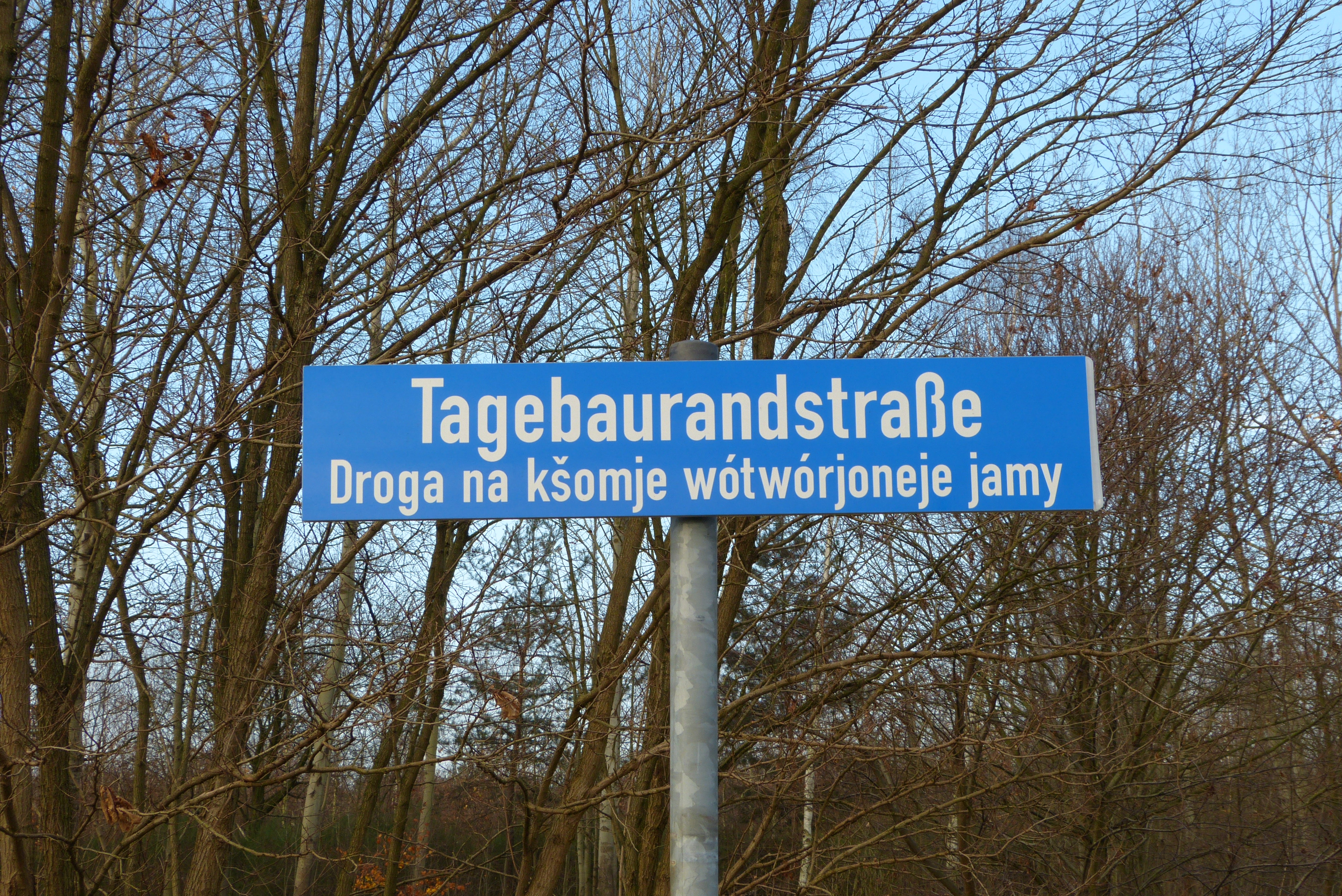
Street sign in Spremberg showing both German and Sorbian names”

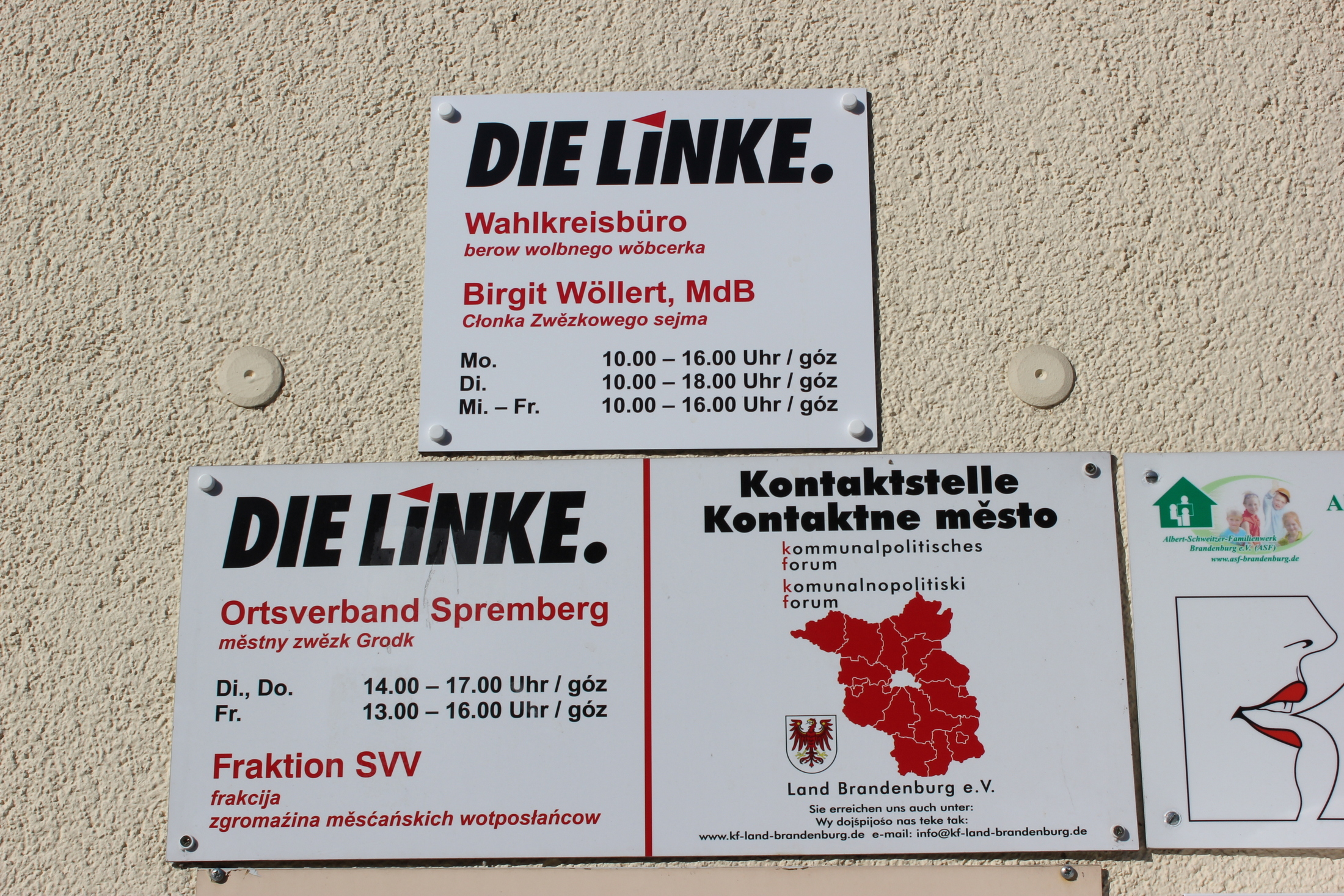
Bilingual German and Lower Sorbian signs in Spremberg

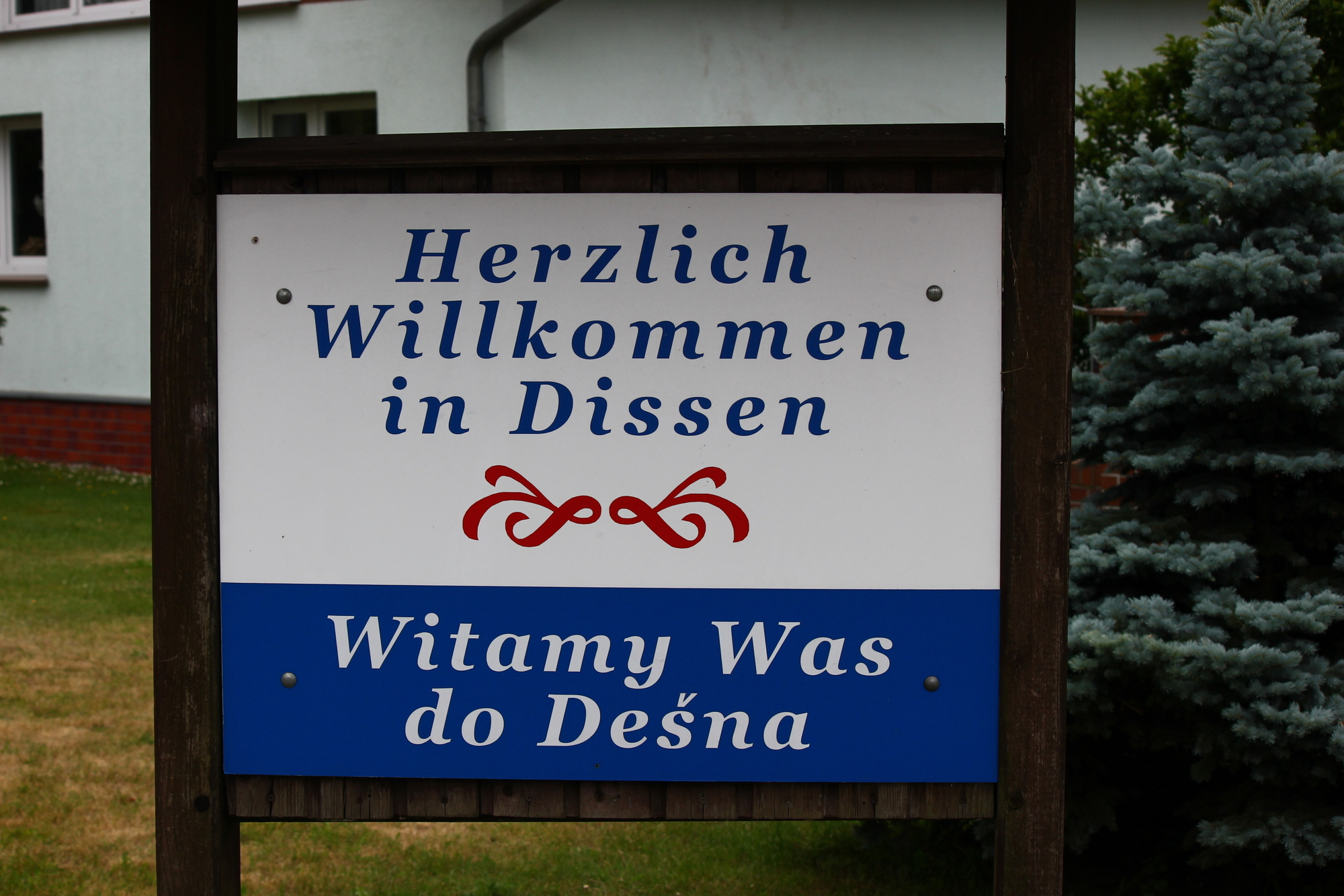
Welcome sign in Dissen

=== Dialects ===
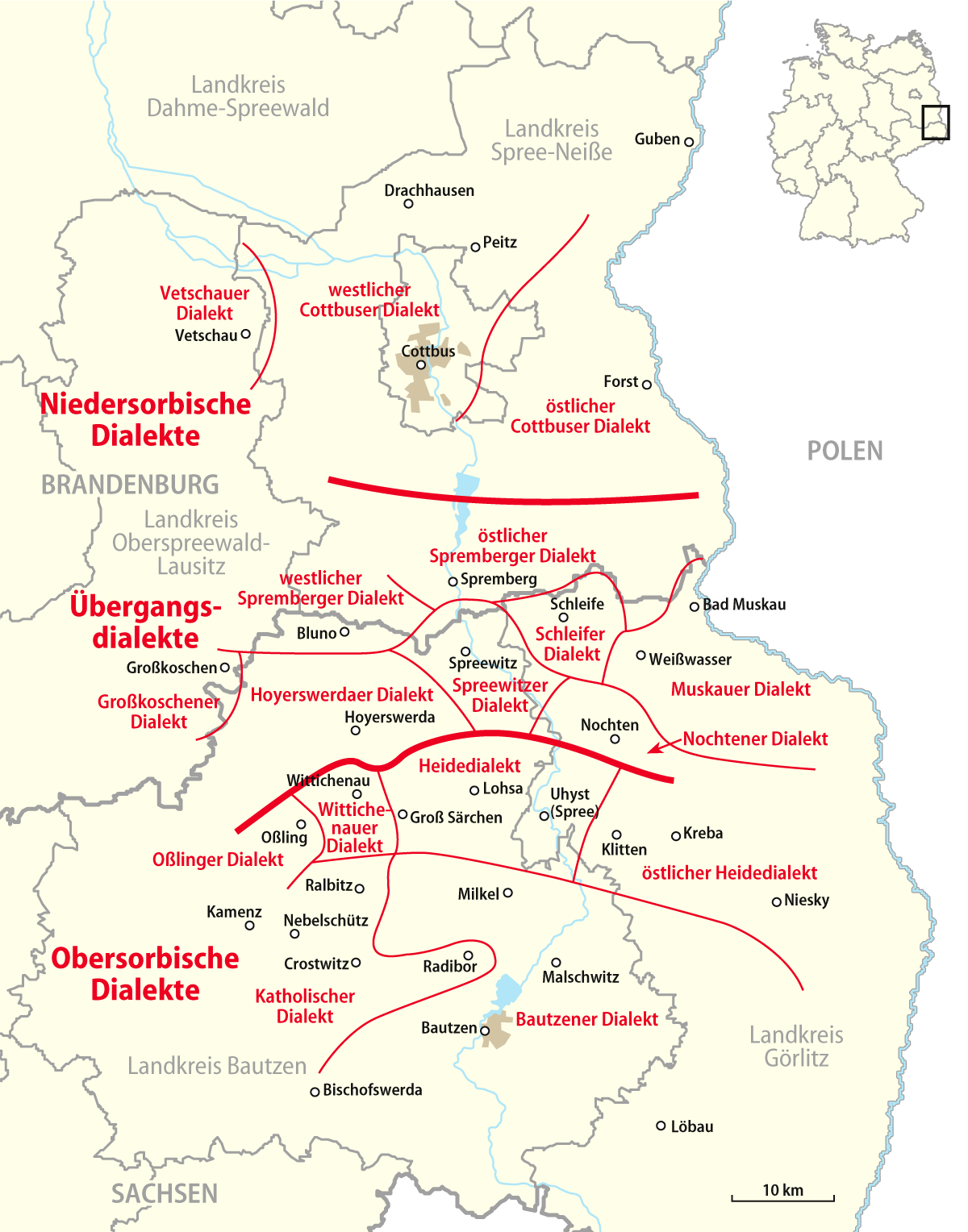
Sorbian dialect

According to the classification of Sorbian dialects compiled by A. Muka, the Lower Sorbian area includes the following dialects:

- Eastern Cottbus dialect
- Eastern Peitz dialect
- Eastern Spremberg dialect
- Western Cottbus dialect
- Western Peitz dialect
- Western Spremberg dialect
- Guben dialect
- Żarow (Žarow) dialect
- Bězkow–Štorkow dialect
- Spreewald dialect

According to the dialectological map of Sorbian dialects presented in the book by Heinz Schuster-Šewc, the Lower Sorbian dialect area comprises three dialects:

- Vetošow dialect (wětošojska narěc)
- Eastern Cottbus dialect (pódwjacorna chóśebuska narěc)
- Western Cottbus dialect (pódzajtšna chóśebuska narěc)

== Phonology ==
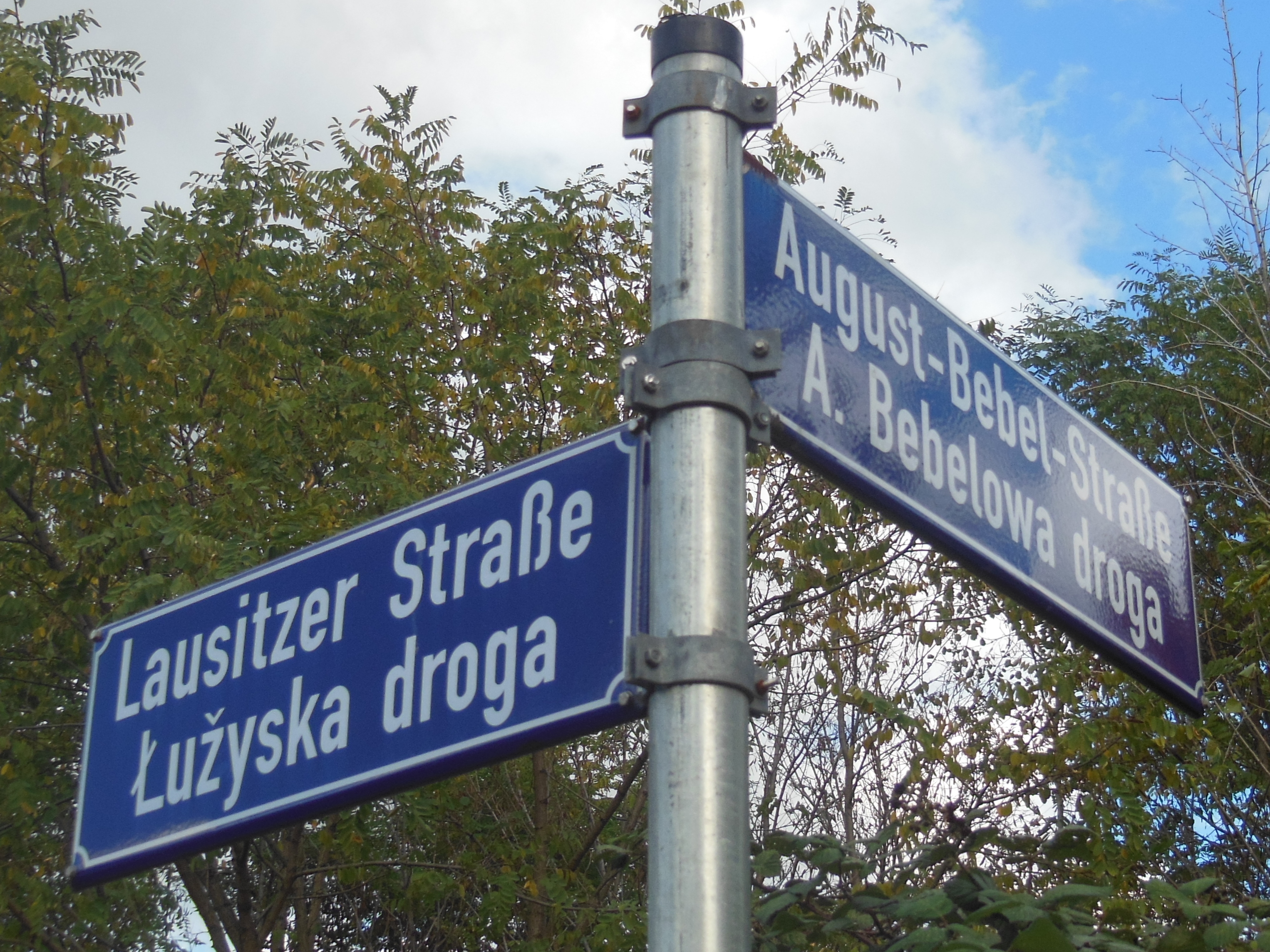
Bilingual road sign in Cottbus, Germany

The phonology of Lower Sorbian has been greatly influenced by contact with German, especially in Cottbus and larger towns. For example, German-influenced pronunciation tends to have a voiced uvular fricative [ʁ] instead of the alveolar trill [r]. In villages and rural areas, German influence is less marked, and the pronunciation is more "typically Slavic".

=== Consonants ===
Consonant phonemes
		Labial		Dental/ Alveolar		Postalveolar		Dorsal		Glottal
		hard	soft	hard	soft	hard	soft	hard	soft	Glottal
Nasal		m	(mʲ)	n	nʲ			(ŋ)	(ŋʲ)	
Plosive	voiceless	p	(pʲ)	t	(tʲ)			k	(kʲ)	
Plosive	voiced	b	(bʲ)	d	(dʲ)			ɡ	(ɡʲ)	
Affricate				t͡s		t͡ʃ	t͡ɕ			
Fricative	voiceless	f	(fʲ)	s		ʃ	ɕ	x	(xʲ)	h
Fricative	voiced	v	(vʲ)	z		ʒ	ʑ			
Trill				r	rʲ					
Approximant		w	wʲ	l	(lʲ)				j	

- /m, mʲ, p, pʲ, b, bʲ/ are bilabial, whereas /f, v/ are labiodental, /w, wʲ/ are labiovelar, although the latter may be a labial–palatal approximant.
- Consonants in parentheses are allophones of another consonant before another consonant or vowel, for example /m/ may palatalize to /mʲ/ before front vowels or /j/, and /n/ may assimilate to /ŋ/ before velar consonants.
- The Proto-Slavic contrasts between /m, p, b, v/ and their palatalized counterparts has been lost phonetically in Lower Sorbian, with the marginal phonemes occurring only before certain vowels. The contrasts between /t, d/ and their palatalized counterparts has evolved into a contrast between /t, d/ and /ɕ, ʑ/. The contrast between /l/ and its palatalized counterpart has evolved into a contrast between /w, l/ while the contrasts between /n, r/ and their palatalized counterparts has remained intact and the contrasts between /s, z/ and their palatalized counterparts no longer exists.
- /n, nʲ, l, r, rʲ/ are alveolar [n, nʲ, l, r, rʲ], whereas /t, d, t͡s, s, z/ are dental [t̪, d̪, t̪͡s̪, s̪, z̪].
- /t͡ʃ, ʃ, ʒ/ have been variously transcribed with ⟨t͡ʃ, ʃ, ʒ⟩ and ⟨t͡ʂ, ʂ, ʐ⟩. Their actual phonetic realization is flat postalveolar [t͡ʃ˖, ʃ˖, ʒ˖] in all of the Lower Sorbian-speaking area. This is unlike in standard Upper Sorbian, where these are palato-alveolar [t͡ʃ, ʃ, ʒ].

==== Final devoicing and assimilation ====
Lower Sorbian has both final devoicing and regressive voicing assimilation:

- dub /dub/ "oak" is pronounced [dup]
- susedka /ˈsusedka/ "(female) neighbor" is pronounced [ˈsusetka]
- licba /ˈlit͡sba/ "number" is pronounced [ˈlʲid͡zba]

The hard postalveolar fricative /ʃ/ is assimilated to [ɕ] before /t͡ɕ/:

- šćit /ʃt͡ɕit/ "protection" is pronounced [ɕt͡ɕit]

=== Vowels ===
The vowel inventory of Lower Sorbian is exactly the same as that of Upper Sorbian. It is also very similar to the vowel inventory of Slovene.

Vowel phonemes
	Front	Central	Back
Close	i	(ɨ)	u
Close-mid	e		o
Open-mid	ɛ		ɔ
Open		a	

Diphthong	i-	-j	-w
Close	iɪ	ij ɨj uj	iw ɨw uw
Mid		ej ɔj	ɛw ow
Open		aj	aw

- /i/ is retracted to [ɨ] after hard consonants.
- /e, o/ are diphthongized to [i̯ɛ, u̯ɔ] in slow speech.
- The /e–ɛ/ and /o–ɔ/ distinctions are weakened or lost in unstressed syllables.
- /a/ is phonetically central [ä].

=== Stress ===
Stress in Lower Sorbian normally falls on the first syllable of the word:

- Łužyca [ˈwuʒɨt͡sa] "Lusatia"
- pśijaśel [ˈpɕijaɕɛl] "friend"
- Chóśebuz [ˈxɨɕɛbus] "Cottbus"

In loanwords, stress may fall on any of the last three syllables:

- internat [intɛrˈnat] "boarding school"
- kontrola [kɔnˈtrɔla] "control"
- september [sɛpˈtɛmbɛr] "September"
- policija [pɔˈlʲit͡sija] "police"
- organizacija [ɔrɡanʲiˈzat͡sija] "organization"

Most one-syllable prepositions attract the stress to themselves when they precede a noun or pronoun of one or two syllables:

- na dwórje [ˈna dwɨrʲɛ] "on the courtyard"
- pśi mnjo [ˈpɕi mnʲɔ] "near me"
- do města [ˈdɔ mʲɛsta] "into the city" (the [iɪ̯] of město [ˈmʲiɪ̯stɔ] becomes [ɛ] when unstressed)

However, nouns of three or more syllables retain their stress:

- pśed wucabnikom [pɕɛd ˈut͡sabnʲikɔm] "in front of the teacher"
- na drogowanju [na ˈdrɔɡowanʲu] "on a journey"

== Orthography ==
The Sorbian alphabet is based on the Latin script but uses diacritics such as the acute accent and caron and includes 36 letters:

No.	Letter	Name	Sound (IPA)
1	A a	a	[ a ]
2	B b	bej	[ b ]
3	C c	cej	[ t͡s ]
4	Č č	čej	[ t͡ʃ ]
5	Ć ć	ćej	[ t͡ɕ ]
6	D d	dej	[ d ]
7	Dź dź	dźej	[ d͡ʑ ]
8	E e	e	[ ɛ ]
9	Ě ě	ět	[ ɪ / e ]
10	F f	ef	[ f ]
11	G g	gej	[ g ]
12	H h	ha	[ ɦ ]
13	Ch ch	cha	[ x ]
14	I i	i	[ i ]
15	J j	jot	[ j ]
16	K k	ka	[ k ]
17	Ł ł	eł	[ u̯ ]
18	L l	el	[ l ]

No.	Letter	Name	Sound (IPA)
19	M m	em	[ m ]
20	N n	en	[ n ]
21	Ń ń	eń	[ ɲ ]
22	O o	o	[ ɔ ]
23	Ó ó	ót	[ ɛ / ɨ / ʊ ]
24	P p	pej	[ p ]
25	R r	er	[ r ]
26	Ŕ ŕ	eŕ	[ rʲ ]
27	S s	es	[ s ]
28	Š š	eš	[ ʃ ]
29	Ś ś	śej	[ ɕ ]
30	T t	tej	[ t ]
31	U u	u	[ u ]
32	W w	wej	[ u̯ ]
33	Y y	y	[ ɨ ]
34	Z z	zet	[ z ]
35	Ž ž	žet	[ ʒ ]
36	Ź ź	źej	[ ʑ ]

The letters Qq, Vv, and Xx are used only in foreign proper names.

To represent certain sounds of the Lower Sorbian language, letters with diacritics are used (ŕ, ź, ś, ž, š, ě) as well as digraphs (dź and ch).

The palatalization of consonants is not indicated in writing if they are followed by the letters ě and i; before all other vowels, palatalization is marked by the letter j (mjod “honey”, pjas “dog”), and in other positions by the acute accent (´).

The grapheme ó was removed from the Lower Sorbian alphabet in 1952, but was restored in 2007.

== Linguistic characteristics ==
=== Prosody ===
Stress in Lower Sorbian is expiratory and is placed mainly on the first syllable. In four-syllable and longer words, an additional stress falls on the penultimate syllable (ˈspiwaˌjucy “singing”). In compound words, the additional stress is placed on the first syllable of the second component (ˈdolnoˌserbski “Lower Sorbian”). In some borrowed words, the stress falls on the same syllable as in the source language (sepˈtember “September”, preˈzidium “presidium”).

=== Morphology ===
==== Noun ====
The noun in the Lower Sorbian language has the grammatical categories of gender (masculine, feminine, neuter), number (singular, dual, and plural), case, and animacy.

Nouns decline in six cases: nominative, genitive, dative, accusative, instrumental, and locative, and also have a vocative form.

Animacy/inanimacy is distinguished only in masculine nouns. In animate nouns, the accusative form coincides with the genitive form (in the singular and dual always, and in the plural only after numerals and the pronouns my and wy).

There are three declensions of feminine nouns:

- The 1st includes nouns with a stem ending in a hard consonant and the ending -a in the nominative case.
- The 2nd includes nouns with a stem ending in a soft or hardened (historically soft) consonant (c, s, z, š, ž) and the ending -a in the nominative case.
- The 3rd includes nouns ending in a consonant in the nominative case.

In the neuter gender, two main declensions are distinguished:

- The 1st includes nouns with a stem ending in a hard consonant.
- The 2nd includes nouns with a stem ending in a velar (k, g, ch), soft, or hardened (historically soft) consonant. Separately considered are nouns with the extensions -t-/-ś- and -n- in oblique cases.

In masculine nouns, two declensions are distinguished:

- The 1st includes nouns with a stem ending in a hard consonant.
- The 2nd includes nouns with a stem ending in a velar (k, g, ch), soft, or hardened (historically soft) consonant.

Declension of feminine and neuter nouns using the examples głowa “head,” droga “road,” zemja “earth,” duša “soul,” kosć “bone,” rěc “language,” słowo “word,” słyńco “sun,” śele “calf,” mě “name.”:

Feminine						Neuter				
Case and number	I declension		II declension		III declension		I declension	II declension		
Nominative singular	głowa	droga	zemja	duša	kosć	rěc	słowo	słyńco	śele	mě
Genitive singular	głowy	drogi	zemje	duše	kosći	rěcy	słowa	słyńca	śeleśa	mjenja
Dative singular	głowje	droze	zemi	dušy	kosći	rěcy	słowu / słowoju	słyńcu / słyńcoju	śeleśu / śeleśoju	mjenju / mjenjoju
Accusative singular	głowu	drogu	zemju	dušu	kosć	rěc	słowo	słyńco	śele	mě
Instrumental singular	głowu	drogu	zemju	dušu	kosću	rěcu	słowom	słyńcom	śeleśim	mjenim
Locative singular	głowje	droze	zemi	dušy	kosći	rěcy	słowje	słyńcu	śeleśu	mjenju
Nominative dual	głowje	droze	zemi	dušy	kosći	rěcy	słowje	słyńcy	śeleśi	mjeni
Genitive dual	głowowu	drogowu	zemjowu	dušowu	kosćowu	rěcowu	słowowu	słyńcowu	śeleśowu	mjenjowu
Dative dual	głowoma	drogoma	zemjoma	dušoma	kosćoma	rěcoma	słowoma	słyńcoma	śeleśoma	mjenjoma
Accusative dual	głowje	droze	zemi	dušy	kosći	rěcy	słowje	słyńcy	śeleśi	mjeni
Instrumental dual	głowoma	drogoma	zemjoma	dušoma	kosćoma	rěcoma	słowoma	słyńcoma	śeleśoma	mjenjoma
Locative dual	głowoma	drogoma	zemjoma	dušoma	kosćoma	rěcoma	słowoma	słyńcoma	śeleśoma	mjenjoma
Nominative plural	głowy	drogi	zemje	duše	kosći	rěcy	słowa	słyńca	śeleta	mjenja
Genitive plural	głowow	drogow	zemjow	dušow	kosćow, kosći	rěcow	słowow, słow	słyńcow	śeletow	mjenjow
Dative plural	głowam	drogam	zemjam	dušam	kosćam	rěcam	słowam	słyńcam	śeletam	mjenjam
Accusative plural	głowy	drogi	zemje	duše	kosći	rěcy	słowa	słyńca	śeleta	mjenja
Instrumental plural	głowami	drogami	zemjami	dušami	kosćami	rěcami	słowami	słyńcami	śeletami	mjenjami
Locative plural	głowach	drogach	zemjach	dušach	kosćach	rěcach	słowach	słyńcach	śeletach	mjenjach

Declension of masculine nouns using the example words klěb “bread,” kóńc “end,” brjuch “belly,” kowal “blacksmith”:

Case and number	I declension	II declension		
Nominative singular	klěb	kóńc	brjuch	kowal
Genitive singular	klěba	kóńca	brjucha	kowala
Dative singular	klěboju	kóńcoju	brjuchoju	kowaleju
Accusative singular	klěb	kóńc	brjuch	kowala
Instrumental singular	klěbom	kóńcom	brjuchom	kowalom
Locative singular	klěbje	kóńcu	brjuše / brjuchu	kowalu
Nominative dual	klěba	kóńca	brjucha	kowala
Genitive dual	klěbowu	kóńcowu	brjuchowu	kowalowu
Dative dual	klěboma	kóńcoma	brjuchoma	kowaloma
Accusative dual	klěba	kóńca	brjucha	kowalowu
Instrumental dual	klěboma	kóńcoma	brjuchoma	kowaloma
Locative dual	klěboma	kóńcoma	brjuchoma	kowaloma
Nominative plural	klěby	końce	brjuchy	kowale
Genitive plural	klěbow	kóńcow	brjuchow	kowalow
Dative plural	klěbam	kóńcam	brjucham	kowalam
Accusative plural	klěby	kóńce	brjuchy	kowale, kowalow
Instrumental plural	klěbami	kóńcami	brjuchami	kowalami
Locative plural	klěbach	kóńcach	brjuchach	kowalach

==== Adjective ====
Adjectives are divided into four categories:

1. Relatively qualitative – expressing a subjective property: dobry “good,” stary “old,” niski “low.”
2. Absolutely qualitative – expressing an objective property: běły “white,” bosy “barefoot,” chory “sick.”
3. Relative – expressing the quality of an object through another object: drjewjany “wooden,” słomjany “strawen,” swinjecy “porcine.”
4. Possessive – expressing possession: nanowy “father’s,” sotśiny “sister’s.”

Adjectives have two types of declension — soft (including adjectives whose stem ends in a soft consonant, as well as k and g) and hard (including all the others).

Declension of hard-type adjectives using the example dobry “good”:

Case		Singular			Dual	Plural
Case		Masculine	Neuter	Feminine	Dual	Plural
Nominative		dobry	dobre	dobra	dobrej	dobre
Genitive		dobrego	dobrego	dobreje	dobreju	dobrych
Dative		dobremu	dobremu	dobrej	dobryma	dobrym
Accusative	inanimate	dobry	dobre	dobru	dobrej	dobre, dobrych
Accusative	animate	dobrego	dobre	dobru	dobreju	dobrych
Instrumental		dobrym	dobrym	dobreju	dobryma	dobrymi
Locative		dobrem	dobrem	dobrej	dobryma	dobrych

Declension of soft-type adjectives using the example drogi “dear”:

Case		Singular			Dual	Plural
Case		Masculine	Neuter	Feminine	Dual	Plural
Nominative		drogi	droge	droga	drogej	droge
Genitive		drogego	drogego	drogeje	drogeju	drogich
Dative		drogemu	drogemu	drogej	drogima	drogim
Accusative	inanimate	drogi	droge	drogu	drogej	droge
Accusative	animate	drogego	droge	drogu	drogeju	droge, drogich
Instrumental		drogim	drogim	drogeju	drogima	drogimi
Locative		drogem	drogem	drogej	drogima	drogich

In colloquial speech and in the literary language, some final vowels in endings may be dropped:

- -eg instead of -ego (genitive singular masculine and neuter)
- -ej instead of -eje (genitive singular feminine)
- -em instead of -emu (dative singular masculine and neuter)
- -ej instead of -eju (instrumental singular feminine).

Degrees of comparison are formed only from relative-qualitative adjectives.

- Comparative: Formed with the suffix -šy (if the stem ends in one consonant) and -(j)ejšy (for stems ending in two or more consonants):
  - młody → młodšy
  - nowy → nowšy
  - mocny → mocnjejšy
  - śopły → śoplejšy Suffixes -ki and -oki are dropped, and consonant alternations often occur in the stem:
  - daloki “far” → dalšy
  - bliski “near” → blišy
  - śěžki “heavy” → śěšy
  - drogi “dear” → drošy Some comparatives are formed suppletively:
  - wjeliki “big” → wětšy
  - mały “small” → mjeńšy
  - dobry “good” → lěpšy
  - zły “evil” → góršy
  - dłujki “long” → dlejšy
- Superlative: Formed by adding the prefix nej-/nejž- to the comparative.

Besides the synthetic method, there is also an analytic method where the comparative is made by adding the adverb wěcej “more” to the positive form. In dialects and older written monuments, the locative singular ending -em (masculine and neuter) is often replaced by the instrumental ending -ym/-im.

==== Numerals ====
Numerals from one to twenty-one:

Cardinal			Ordinal	Collective
	Animate (masc.)	Other	Ordinal	Collective
1	jaden (masc,), jadna (fem.), jadno (neu.)		prědny	
2	dwa (masc.), dwě (fem., neu.)		drugi	dwóji
3	tśo	tśi	tśeśi	tšoji
4	styrjo	styri	stwórty	stwóry
5	pěśo / pěś	pěś	pěty	pěśory
6	šesćo / šesć	šesć	šesty	šesćory
7	sedymjo / sedym	sedym	sedymy	sedymory
8	wósymjo / wósym	wósym	wósymy	wósymory
9	źewjeśo / źewjeś	źewjeś	źewjety	źewjeśory
10	źaseśo / źaseś	źaseś	źasety	źaseśory
11	jadnasćo		jadnasty	jadnasćory
12	dwanasćo		dwanasty	
13	tśinasćo		tśinasty	
14	styrnasćo		styrnasty	
15	pěśnasćo		pěśnasty	
16	šesnasćo		šesnaty	
17	sedymnasćo		sedymnasty	
18	wósymnasćo		wósymnasty	
19	źewjeśnasćo		źewjeśnasty	
20	dwaźasća		dwaźasty	
21	jadenadwaźasća		jadenadwaźasty	

Although in modern Standard Lower Sorbian the compound numerals from 21 to 99 are formed according to the German model (jadenadwaźasća like German einundzwanzig, literally “one and twenty”), in written monuments and some dialects the original Slavic forms such as dwaźasća a jaden (“twenty and one”) have been preserved.

Numerals from thirty to one billion:

	Cardinal	Ordinal
30	tśiźasća	tśiźasty
40	styrźasća	styrźasty
50	pěśźaset	pěśźasety
60	šesćźaset	šesćźasety
70	sedymźaset	sedymźasety
80	wósymźaset	wósymźasety
90	źewjeśźaset	źewjeśźasety
100	sto	stoty
101	sto a jaden	sto a prěni
200	dwěsćě	dwěstoty
300	tśista	tśistoty
400	styrista	styristoty
500	pěśstow	pěśstoty
600	šesćstow	šesćstoty
700	sedymstow	sedymstoty
800	wósymstow	wósymstoty
900	źewjeśstow	źewjeśstoty
1000	tysac	tysacny
2000	dwa tysac	dwatysacny
3000	tśi tysac	tśitysacny
4000	styri tysac	styritysacny
5000	pěś tysac	pěśtysacny
1 000 000	milion	milionty
2 000 000	dwa miliona	dwamilionty
1 000 000 000	miliarda	miliardny

In colloquial speech, instead of the native sto and tysac, the Germanisms hundert (< German hundert “hundred”) and towzynt (< German tausend “thousand”) are used.

Declension of the numeral “one”:

Case		Singular			Plural
Case		Masculine	Neuter	Feminine	Plural
Nominative		jaden	jadno	jadna	jadne
Genitive		jadnogo		jadneje	jadnych
Dative		jadnomu		jadnej	jadnym
Accusative	inanimate	jaden	jadno	jadnu	jadne
Accusative	animate	jadnogo	jadno	jadnu	jadne
Instrumental		jadnym		jadneju	jadnymi
Locative		jadnom		jadnej	jadnych

Declension of the numerals “two,” “three,” “four”:

Case		Two		Three		Four	
Case		Masculine	Neuter and feminine	Masculine (animate)	Masculine (inanimate), neuter and feminine	Masculine (animate)	Masculine (inanimate), neuter and feminine
Nominative		dwa	dwě	tśo	tśi	styrjo	styri
Genitive		dweju		tśoch	tśich	styrjoch	styrich
Dative		dwěma		tśom	tśim	styrjom	styrim
Accusative	inanimate	dwa	dwě	tśoch	tśi	styrjoch	styri
Accusative	animate	dweju	dwě	tśoch	tśi	styrjoch	styri
Instrumental		dwěma		tśomi	tśimi	styrjomi	styrimi
Locative		dwěma		tśoch	tśich	styrjoch	styrich

==== Pronoun ====
Declension of personal pronouns of the first and second person:

Case	First person				Second person			
Case	I		We	The two of us	You		You	The two of you
	without preposition	after the preposition			without preposition	after the preposition		
Nominative	ja		my	mej	ty		wy	wej
Genitive	mě	mnjo	nas	naju	śi, tebje	tebje	was	waj
Dative	mě	mnjo	nam	nama	śi, tebje	tebje	wam	wama
Accusative	mě	mnjo	nas	naju	śi, tebje	tebje	was	waj
Instrumental		mnu	nami	nama		tobu	wami	wama
Locative		mnjo	nas	nama		tebje	was	wama

Declension of personal pronouns of the third person:

Case		Singular						Dual		Plural	
Case		Masculine		Neuter		Feminine		Dual		Plural	
Case		without preposition	after the preposition	without preposition	after the preposition	without preposition	after the preposition	without preposition	after the preposition	without preposition	after the preposition
Nominative		wón		wóno		wóna		wónej		wóni	
Genitive		jogo	njogo	jogo	njogo	jeje	njeje	jeju	njeju	jich	no
Dative		jomu	njomu	jomu	njomu	jj	njej	Jima	nima	jim	nim
Accusative	inanimate	jen	njen	jo	njo	ju	nju	jj	njej	je	nje
Accusative	animate	jogo	njogo	jo	njo	ju	nju	jeju	njeju	jich	no
Instrumental			nim		nim		njeju		nima		nimi
Locative			njom		njom		njej		nima		no

==== Verb ====
In Lower Sorbian, the verb has the following categories: tense, mood, aspect, voice, person, number, and gender.

===== Tenses =====
In the literary Lower Sorbian language, the tense system consists of the present and future tenses, the perfect, pluperfect, aorist, and imperfect. However, as early as the 19th century, the aorist, imperfect, and pluperfect began disappearing from spoken language, and at present they are going out of use even in the literary language.

In the present tense, four conjugations are distinguished (in -o-/-jo-, -i-, -a-, and -j-) with 13 subtypes.

Conjugation of verbs in -o-/-jo- using the examples studowaś “to study,” wuknuś “to teach,” piś “to drink,” chromjeś “to limp,” braś “to take,” sypaś “to pour,” njasć “to carry”:

Person and number	Type I	Type II	Type III	Type IV	Type V	Type VI	Type VII
1st singular	studuju / studujom	wuknu / wuknjom	piju / pijom	chromjeju / chromjejom	bjeru / bjerjom	sypju / sypjom	njasu / njasom
2nd singular	studujoš	wuknjoš	pijoš	chromjejoš	bjerjoš	sypjoš	njasoš
3rd singular	studujo	wuknjo	pijo	chromjejo	bjerjo	sypjo	njaso
1st dual	studujomej	wuknjomej	pijomej	chromjejomej	bjerjomej	sypjomej	njasomej
2nd dual	studujotej	wuknjotej	pijotej	chromjejotej	bjerjotej	sypjotej	njasotej
3nd dual	studujotej	wuknjotej	pijotej	chromjejotej	bjerjotej	sypjotej	njasotej
1st plural	studujomy	wuknjomy	pijomy	chromjejomy	bjerjomy	sypjomy	njasomy
2nd plural	studujośo	wuknjośo	pijośo	chromjejośo	bjerjośo	sypjośo	njasośo
3rd plural	studuju	wuknu	piju	chromjeju	bjeru	sypju	njasu

Type I includes verbs with the suffix -owa- in the infinitive (changing to -uj- in the present), Type II — with -nu- in the infinitive. Type III contains monosyllabic verbs whose infinitive stem ends in a vowel, Type IV — polysyllabic verbs whose infinitive stem ends in -(j)e-, Type V — disyllabic verbs whose infinitive stem ends in -a-. Type VI includes verbs with a monosyllabic stem ending in -a- or -ě-, and Type VII — monosyllabic verbs with a stem ending in a consonant. The ending -om in the 1st person singular predominates in eastern dialects and the Vetschau dialect, but is actively spreading into literary Lower Sorbian.

Conjugation of verbs in -i-, -a-, and -j- using the examples sejźeś “to sit,” licyś “to count,” źěłaś “to do/make,” stojaś “to stand”:

Person and number	in -i-		in -a-	in -j-
1st singular	sejźim	licym	źěłam	stojm
2nd singular	sejźiš	licyš	źěłaš	stojš
3rd singular	sejźi	licy	źěła	stoj
1st dual	sejźimej	licymej	źěłamej	stojmej
2nd dual	sejźitej	licytej	źěłatej	stojtej
3rd dual	sejźitej	licytej	źěłatej	stojtej
1st plural	sejźimy	licymy	źěłamy	stojmy
2nd plural	sejźiśo	licyśo	źěłaśo	stojśo
3rd plural	sejźe	lice	źěłaju	stoje

Within the -i- conjugation, three types are distinguished: with infinitives ending in -iś/-yś, -aś, and -eś. In the -j- conjugation, two types are distinguished: the first includes monosyllabic verbs whose infinitive and present stems end in -j-, the second — disyllabic verbs with an infinitive ending in -a- and a present tense in -j-.

Conjugation of irregular verbs byś “to be,” wěźeś “to know,” jěsć “to eat,” měś “to have,” kśěś “to want,” jěś “to go (by vehicle),” hyś “to go (on foot)”:

Person and number	byś	wěźeś	jěsć	měś	kśěś	jěś	hyś
1st singular	som	wěm	jěm	mam	cu / com	jědu / jěźom	du / źom
2nd singular	sy	wěš	jěš	maš	coš	jěźoš	źoš
3rd singular	jo	wě	jě	ma	co	jěźo	źo
1st dual	smej	wěmej	jěmej	mamej	comej	jěźomej	źomej
2nd dual	stej	wěstej	jěstej	matej	cotej	jěźotej	źotej
3rd dual	stej	wěstej	jěstej	matej	cotej	jěźotej	źotej
1st plural	smy	wěmy	jěmy	mamy	comy	jěźomy	źomy
2nd plural	sćo	wěsćo	jěsćo	maśo	cośo	jěźośo	źośo
3rd plural	su	wěźe	jěźe	maju	kśě / coju	jědu	du

Perfect is formed analytically: its forms consist of the -ł participle and the auxiliary verb byś in the present tense. Conjugation of piś “to drink” in the perfect:

Person	Singular			Dual	Plural
Person	Masculine	Feminine	Neuter	Dual	Plural
1st singular	som pił	som piła	*som piło	smej piłej	smy pili
2nd singular	sy pił	sy piła	*sy piło	stej piłej	sćo pili
3rd singular	jo pił	jo piła	jo piło	stej piłej	su pili

The pluperfect is formed in the same way as the perfect, but the verb byś “to be” is in the imperfect tense. In literary Lower Sorbian, aorist forms are built from perfective verbs, and imperfect forms are built from imperfective verbs.

Conjugation of verbs in the imperfect, using kupowaś “to buy,” biś “to beat,” braś “to take,” and byś “to be” as examples:

Person and number	kupowaś	biś	braś	byś
1st singular	kupowach	bijach	bjerjech	běch
2nd singular	kupowašo	bijašo	bjerješo	běšo
3rd singular	kupowašo	bijašo	bjerješo	běšo
1st dual	kupowachmej	bijachmej	bjerjechmej	běchmej
2nd dual	kupowaštej	bijaštej	bjerještej	běštej
3rd dual	kupowaštej	bijaštej	bjerještej	běštej
1st plural	kupowachmy	bijachmy	bjerjechmy	běchmy
2nd plural	kupowašćo	bijašćo	bjerješćo	běšćo
3rd plural	kupowachu	bijachu	bjerjechu	běchu

Conjugation of verbs in the aorist, using rozbiś “to break” and wubraś “to choose” as examples:

Person and number	rozbiś	wubraś
1st singular	rozbich	wubrach
2nd singular	rozbi	wubra
3rd singular	rozbi	wubra
1st dual	rozbichmej	wubrachmej
2nd dual	rozbištej	wubraštej
3rd dual	rozbištej	wubraštej
1st plural	rozbichmy	wubrachmy
2nd plural	rozbišćo	wubrašćo
3rd plural	rozbichu	wubrachu

Future tense forms are built from verbs of both aspects by combining special forms of the verb byś “to be” with the infinitive of the main (lexical) verb. Present tense forms of perfective verbs can also be used with future meaning.

For verbs of movement in space, the future tense can be formed with the prefix po-, and for měś “to have,” the prefix z- is used for this purpose.

Conjugation of verbs in the future tense, using pisaś “to write,” hyś “to go (on foot),” and měś “to have” as examples:

Person and number	pisaś	hyś	měś
1st singular	budu / buźom pisaś	pójdu / pójźom	změju / změjom
2nd singular	buźoš pisaś	pójźoš	změjoš
3d singular	buźo pisaś	pójźo	změjo
1st dual	buźomej pisaś	pójźomej	změjomej
2nd dual	buźotej pisaś	pójźotej	změjotej
3rd dual	buźotej pisaś	pójźotej	změjotej
1st plural	buźomy pisaś	pójźomy	změjomy
2nd plural	buźośo pisaś	pójźośo	změjośo
3rd plural	budu pisaś	pójdu	změju

In dialects, colloquial Lower Sorbian, and sometimes in literary works, the future tense forms of the verb byś drop the -u- element: bdu / bźom “I will,” bźoš “you will (sg.),” bźo “he will,” bźomej “we two will,” bźotej “you two will,” bźotej “they two will,” bźomy “we will,” bźośo “you (pl.) will,” bdu “they will”.

==== Moods ====
Lower Sorbian has three moods: indicative, subjunctive, and imperative. Subjunctive forms consist of the ł-participle and the particle by: jěł by “would go (by vehicle),” pśišeł by “would come”.

The second person singular imperative forms are derived from the present tense stem by adding the ending -i or by palatalizing the final consonant of the stem (often accompanied by consonant alternations): bjeru “(they) take” — bjeŕ “take!,” pjaku “(they) bake” — pjac “bake!,” gnu “(they) bend” — gni “bend!”. All other imperative forms are built from the second person singular form by adding the endings -mej (1st person dual), -tej (2nd person dual), -my (1st person plural), -śo/-ćo (2nd person plural).

==== Non-finite forms ====
The infinitive is formed with the suffixes -ś (for the majority of verbs), -ć (after spirants: njasć “to carry,” lězć “to climb”), and -c (for stems ending in k and g: pjac “to bake,” wlac “to drag,” moc “to be able”).

The supine is marked by the suffix -t: Źinsa wjacor pójźomy rejtowat “Tonight we will go dancing”.

The active participle is formed from the present tense stem with the suffixes -uc- and -ec-, plus gender endings: piju “(they) drink” → pijucy “drinking” (masc.), pijuca (fem.), pijuce (neut.); lice “(they) count” → licecy “counting” (masc.), liceca (fem.), licece (neut.). In the nominative singular masculine form it is also used as an adverbial participle: Stupjecy do domu, wiźešo wona, až se pali “Entering the house, she saw that it was on fire”.

The passive participle is formed from the infinitive stem using the suffixes -t- (for a number of monosyllabic verbs) and -n-, plus gender endings: biś “to beat” → bity “beaten” (masc.), bita (fem.), bite (neut.); pisaś “to write” → pisany “written” (masc.), pisana (fem.), pisane (neut.).

==== Adverbs ====
Adverbs are formed from adjectives with the help of the suffixes -e (with palatalization of the preceding consonant), -o, and -ski: głupy “stupid” → głupje, kšuty “hard, tight” → kšuśe, drogi “expensive” → drogo, suchy “dry” → sucho, serbski “Sorbian” → serbski, nimski “German” → nimski. From some adjectives, doublet forms can be formed: twardy “hard” → twarźe, twardo; gładki “smooth” → gładce, gładko.

The comparative degree is formed by adding the suffix -ej to the stem (often with alternation of the preceding consonant): głupje “stupidly” → głupjej, sucho “dryly” → sušej, drogo “expensively” → drošej. The suffixes -oki and -ki are dropped: daloko “far” → dalej, gładko “smoothly” → gładšej. From the adverbs derje “well” and zlě “badly,” the comparative degree forms are suppletive: lěpjej and gorjej (more rarely zlej). The superlative degree is formed by adding the prefix nej- (sometimes nejž-) to the comparative form.

==== Prepositions ====
Prepositions are divided into primary and secondary. Primary prepositions are not related to other parts of speech. Secondary prepositions came from other parts of speech. Prepositions are used with all cases except the nominative and vocative, most often with the genitive/

==== Syntax ====
Word order is free, with the basic order being SOV. Frame constructions are used, although they are less common than in the Upper Sorbian language.

==== Vocabulary ====
As a result of long contact with the German language (for over 1,000 years), Lower Sorbian has borrowed a large number of Germanisms, with their number being higher in dialectal speech than in the literary language. At the same time, the core vocabulary of Lower Sorbian continues to be Slavic. Literary Lower Sorbian is more tolerant of Germanisms than literary Upper Sorbian. In addition to Germanisms, the literary language contains a small percentage of borrowings from other Slavic languages, usually from Czech.

== Media ==
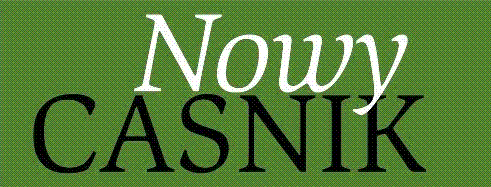
Header of Nowy Casnik

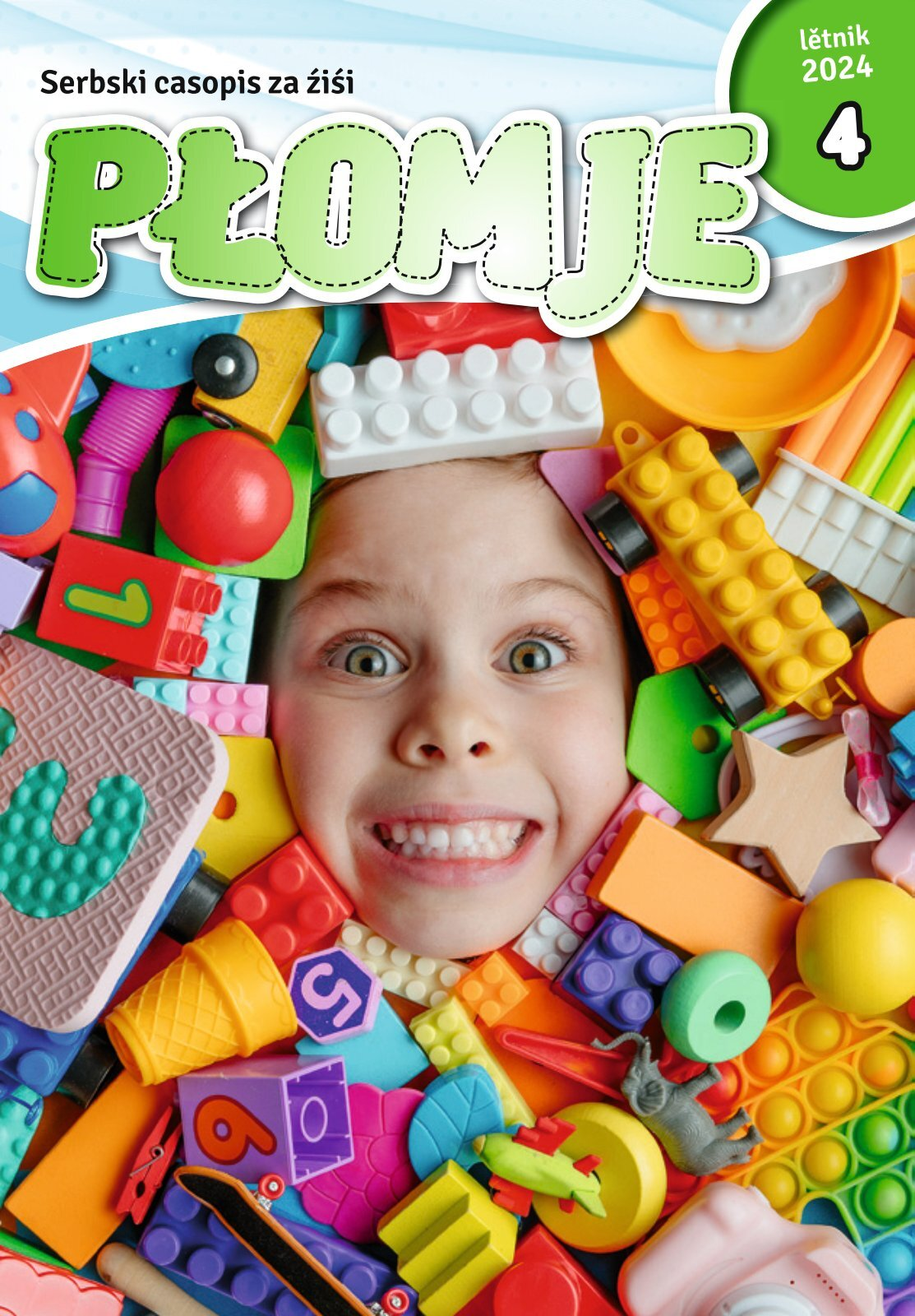
Płomje — the Lower Sorbian counterpart of the Upper Sorbian kids magazine Płomjo

The first newspaper to publish its articles in Lower Sorbian/Wendish was the Bramborski Serbski Casnik. It first appeared in 1848 and was later succeeded by Nowy Casnik. After being banned, Nowy Casnik was re-established in 1947, at first as a weekly supplement to Nowa Doba. Since 1954, it has again been published independently as a weekly newspaper. Today, Nowy Casnik contains articles in both German and Lower Sorbian/Wendish. It has a circulation of about 1,100 copies. For children, the Lower Sorbian/Wendish children's magazine Płomje is published monthly with a circulation of around 850 copies.

On television, since 1992 there has been the monthly television magazine Łužyca, which is alternately presented by Anja Pohontsch and Christian Matthée. Every three months, a special monothematic edition is broadcast.

On radio, the RBB records and broadcasts several-hour-long Lower Sorbian radio programmes (Bramborske serbske radijo). The Lower Sorbian youth programme Bubak is produced by young Lower Sorbss themselves and broadcast by the RBB.

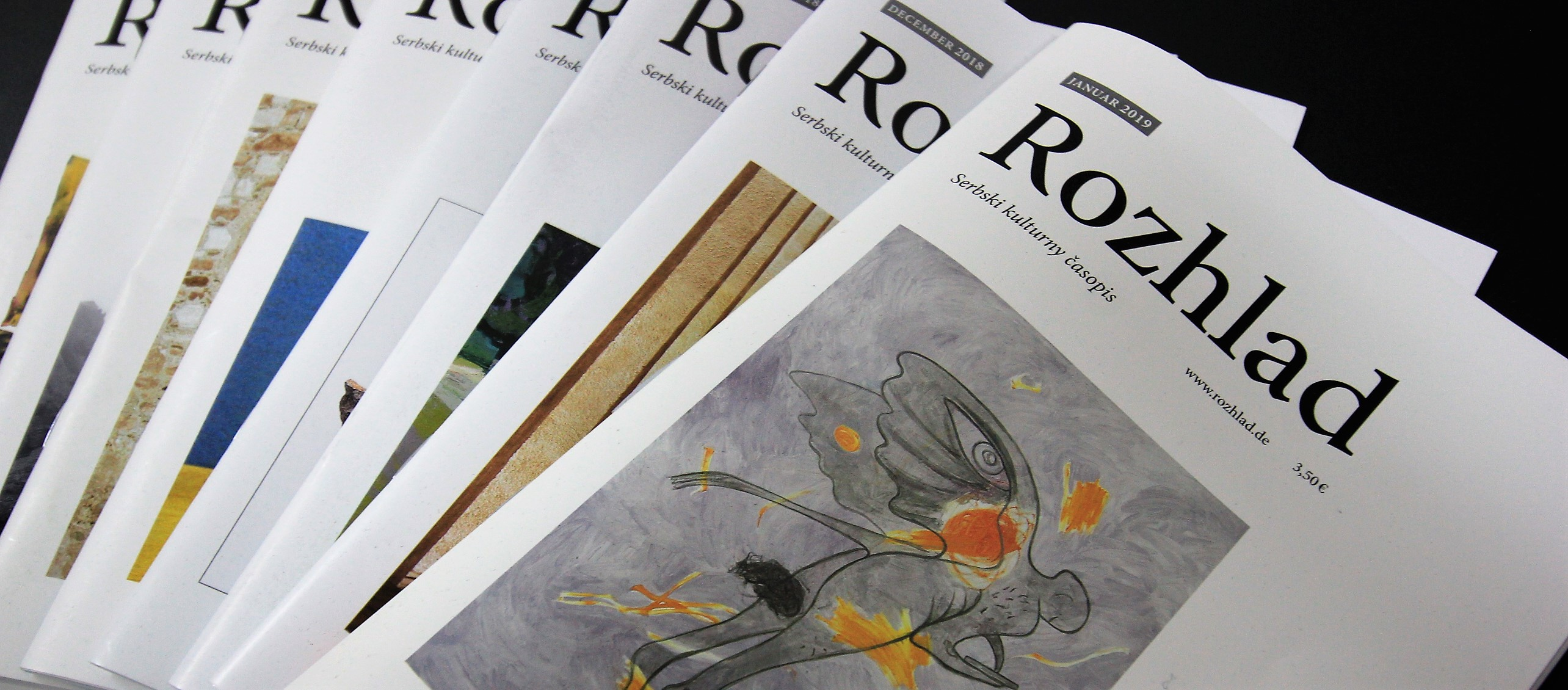
Selected issues of the Sorbian cultural magazine Rozhlad

The Sorbian cultural magazine Rozhlad, which is published monthly in Bautzen, sees itself as a cultural magazine for both Upper and Lower Sorbs. Thus, Rozhlad regularly publishes articles in Lower Sorbian as well as texts on Lower Sorbian topics in Upper Sorbian. The academic journal Lětopis and the educational journal Serbska šula also contain some Lower Sorbian articles.

Several books in Lower Sorbian are published each year by the Domowina Publishing House in Bautzen.

In addition, in the 2000s and 2010s two alternative (satirical) media outlets appeared — Slěpik and Njeknicomnik. Both failed to establish themselves permanently, mainly due to a lack of funding.

== Sample ==
"W cuzej zemi" (In a foreign land) by Mato Kosyk:

Ako mějach kšute spodki
skońcnje pod nogoma raz
a pon zwignuch swoje lodki,
ab kraj pśedrogował zas,
zacuwach bźez wědobnja,
až how njejo domizna:
běch źe w cuzej zemi.

Ak běch pytnuł rězne zuki
pijanego yankeea
grozecego z rjagom ruki
wšomu, což se pśibliža,
zacuwach bźez wědobnja,
až how njejo domizna:
źěch po cuzej zemi.

Ak mě dachu noclěg prědny
w napołnjonej gospoźe,
źož mnjo pśimje carnak bědny
z naźeju na pjenjeze,
zacuwach bźez wědobnja,
až how njejo domizna:
budu źe w cuzej zemi.

Lěc se zemja cuza zdawa
kenž mě kšuśe powita,
glichlan wěm, až buźo pšawa
moja nowa fryjota.
zacuwach bźez wědobnja,
lichy se wot spinanja
how w tej cuzej zemi

Article 1 of the Universal Declaration of Human Rights in Lower Sorbian:

Wšykne luźe su lichotne roźone a jadnake po dostojnosći a pšawach. Woni maju rozym a wědobnosć a maju ze sobu w duchu bratšojstwa wobchadaś. (All people are born free and equal in their dignity and rights. They are given reason and conscience and they shall create their relationships to one another according to the spirit of brotherhood.)

== See also ==
- Upper Sorbian language

== Bibliography ==
- Hannusch, Erwin (1998), Niedersorbisch praktisch und verständlich, Bautzen: Domowina-Verlag, ISBN 3-7420-1667-9
- Howson, Phil (2017), "Foreign language acquisition of perceptually similar segments: evidence from Lower Sorbian", Open Research Europe, 3: 56, doi:10.12688/openreseurope.14895.2, PMC 10964000, PMID 38532923
- Laver, John (1994), Principles of Phonetics, Cambridge: Cambridge University Press, ISBN 0-521-45655-X
- Schuster-Šewc, Heinz (1984), Gramatika hornjoserbskeje rěče, Budyšin: Ludowe nakładnistwo Domowina
- Stone, Gerald (2002), "Sorbian (Upper and Lower)", in Comrie, Bernard; Corbett, Greville G. (eds.), The Slavonic Languages, London and New York: Routledge, pp. 593–685, ISBN 9780415280785
- Zygis, Marzena (2003), "Phonetic and Phonological Aspects of Slavic Sibilant Fricatives" (PDF), ZAS Papers in Linguistics, 3: 175–213, doi:10.21248/zaspil.32.2003.191, archived from the original (PDF) on 2017-10-11
