= Jänschwalde =

Jänschwalde Janšojce
- Municipality
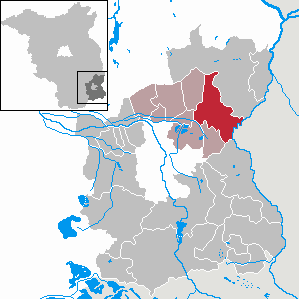
- Location of Jänschwalde within Spree-Neiße district
- Interactive map of Jänschwalde
- Location within Germany Location within Brandenburg
- Coordinates: 51°51′43″N 14°29′57″E
- Country: Germany
- State: Brandenburg
- District: Spree-Neiße
- Municipal assoc.: Peitz
- Subdivisions: 4 Ortsteile

Government
  - Mayor (2024–29): Helmut Badtke

Area
  - Total: 81.24 km^{2} (31.37 sq mi)
- Elevation: 62 m (203 ft)

Population (2025-12-31)
  - Total: 1,572
  - Density: 19.35/km^{2} (50.12/sq mi)
- Demonym(s): German: Jänschwalder; Lower Sorbian: Janšowaŕ (m.), Janšowaŕka (f.)
- Time zone: UTC+01:00 (CET)
  - Summer (DST): UTC+02:00 (CEST)
- Postal codes: 03197, Grießen: 03172
- Dialling codes: 035607, Grießen: 035696
- Vehicle registration: SPN

Jänschwalde (Sorbian: Janšojce) is a municipality in the district of Spree-Neiße in Brandenburg, Germany. It is situated in the region of Lower Lusatia. The nearest town is Peitz; Cottbus is 25 km away.

== Municipal arrangement ==
The municipality of Jänschwalde-Janšojce is divided into three parts:

- Jänschwalde-Dorf
- Kolonie
- Jänschwalde East

=== Jänschwalde-Dorf ===
Jänschwalde-Dorf (village) is separated from Kolonie by a small brook called Puschanitzka. It flows through a field between the two districts. In the village there is a tavern called K5. Not far away from there is a small store and a place called the Jugendbude, for the young people of the village.

Near the store and the Jugendbude is the village church, which was built in 1806/07. In the nearby belltower there are three bells from the 15th and 16th centuries. Also next to the church is the German-Sorb Museum, which details the area's past.

=== Kolonie ===
In Kolonie (colony) the inhabitants have a butcher, a store, a post office, and a restaurant—the brewery Zur Linde. The cemetery is also located in Kolonie.

=== Jänschwalde East ===
Three kilometers into the forest is East Jänschwalde, which was established in 1952 as a housing development for the soldiers of the nearby air base. Here there are mostly new buildings, including a primary school and a kindergarten. There is also das Ländliche Sozio-kulturelle Zentrum (the Rural Socio-Cultural Center), which serves as a meeting place for young and old. Activities there include crafting afternoons, a library, and sport programs, such as judo. East Jänschwalde is also connected to the public railroad network through the Regional Express line from Cottbus to Frankfurt (Oder).

== History ==
From 1815 to 1947, Jänschwalde was part of the Prussian Province of Brandenburg and from 1947 to 1952 of the State of Brandenburg. From 1952 to 1990, it was part of the Bezirk Cottbus of East Germany. Since 1990, it is again part of Brandenburg.

== Demography ==
Development of Population since 1875 within the Current Boundaries (Blue Line: Population; Dotted Line: Comparison to Population Development of Brandenburg state; Grey Background: Time of Nazi rule; Red Background: Time of Communist rule)

Jänschwalde: Population development
within the current boundaries (2013)

Year	Pop.	±% p.a.
1875	2,125	—
1890	2,261	+0.41%
1910	2,239	−0.05%
1925	2,196	−0.13%
1933	2,175	−0.12%
1939	2,160	−0.12%
1946	3,125	+5.42%
1950	2,985	−1.14%
1964	3,335	+0.80%
1971	3,255	−0.35%
1981	3,365	+0.33%
1985	3,181	−1.40%
1989	3,677	+3.69%
1990	3,501	−4.79%
1991	3,373	−3.66%
1992	3,390	+0.50%
1993	3,393	+0.09%
1994	3,304	−2.62%
1995	3,209	−2.88%
1996	3,104	−3.27%

Year	Pop.	±% p.a.
1997	2,976	−4.12%
1998	2,877	−3.33%
1999	2,754	−4.28%
2000	2,807	+1.92%
2001	2,704	−3.67%
2002	2,522	−6.73%
2003	2,222	−11.90%
2004	2,109	−5.09%
2005	2,019	−4.27%
2006	1,963	−2.77%
2007	1,884	−4.02%
2008	1,828	−2.97%
2009	1,776	−2.84%
2010	1,751	−1.41%
2011	1,638	−6.45%
2012	1,585	−3.24%
2013	1,570	−0.95%
2014	1,559	−0.70%
2015	1,535	−1.54%
2016	1,563	+1.82%

== Points of interest ==
- Jänschwalde Power Station
- Cottbus-Drewitz Airport
