= Heinersbrück =

Heinersbrück Móst
- Municipality
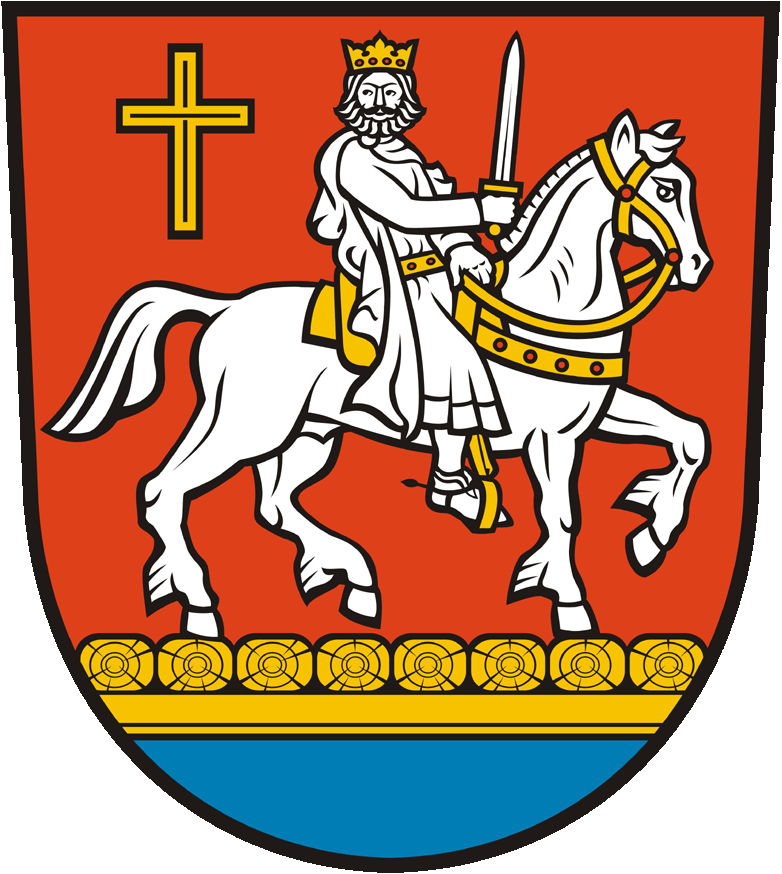
- Coat of arms

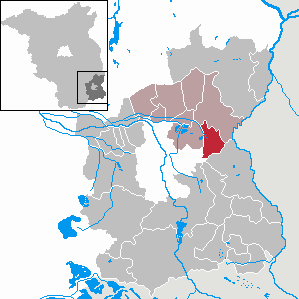
- Location of Heinersbrück within Spree-Neiße district
- Interactive map of Heinersbrück
- Location within Germany Location within Brandenburg
- Coordinates: 51°49′59″N 14°30′00″E
- Country: Germany
- State: Brandenburg
- District: Spree-Neiße
- Municipal assoc.: Peitz

Government
  - Mayor (2024–29): Horst Nattke

Area
  - Total: 23.69 km^{2} (9.15 sq mi)
- Elevation: 62 m (203 ft)

Population (2025-12-31)
  - Total: 549
  - Density: 23.2/km^{2} (60.0/sq mi)
- Demonym(s): German: Heinersbrücker; Lower Sorbian: Mósćanaŕ (m.), Mósćanarka (f.)
- Time zone: UTC+01:00 (CET)
  - Summer (DST): UTC+02:00 (CEST)
- Postal codes: 03185
- Dialling codes: 035601
- Vehicle registration: SPN

Heinersbrück (Sorbian: Móst) is a municipality in the district of Spree-Neiße, in Lower Lusatia, Brandenburg, Germany.

== History ==
From 1815 to 1947, Heinersbrück was part of the Prussian Province of Brandenburg. From 1952 to 1990, it was part of the Bezirk Cottbus of East Germany.

== Demography ==
Development of population since 1875 within the current Boundaries (Blue Line: Population; Dotted Line: Comparison to Population development in Brandenburg state; Grey Background: Time of Nazi Germany; Red Background: Time of communist East Germany)

Heinersbrück: Population development
within the current boundaries (2013)

Year	Pop.	±% p.a.
1875	962	—
1890	1,034	+0.48%
1910	1,087	+0.25%
1925	1,050	−0.23%
1933	1,011	−0.47%
1939	1,124	+1.78%
1946	1,097	−0.35%
1950	1,122	+0.56%
1964	937	−1.28%
1971	910	−0.42%
1981	794	−1.35%
1985	768	−0.83%
1989	751	−0.56%
1990	746	−0.67%
1991	717	−3.89%
1992	689	−3.91%
1993	660	−4.21%
1994	656	−0.61%
1995	656	+0.00%
1996	655	−0.15%

Year	Pop.	±% p.a.
1997	643	−1.83%
1998	696	+8.24%
1999	693	−0.43%
2000	707	+2.02%
2001	695	−1.70%
2002	716	+3.02%
2003	704	−1.68%
2004	691	−1.85%
2005	687	−0.58%
2006	683	−0.58%
2007	668	−2.20%
2008	652	−2.40%
2009	642	−1.53%
2010	632	−1.56%
2011	621	−1.74%
2012	621	+0.00%
2013	608	−2.09%
2014	598	−1.64%
2015	602	+0.67%
2016	580	−3.65%
