= Turnow-Preilack =

Turnow-Preilack Turnow-Pśiłuk
- Municipality
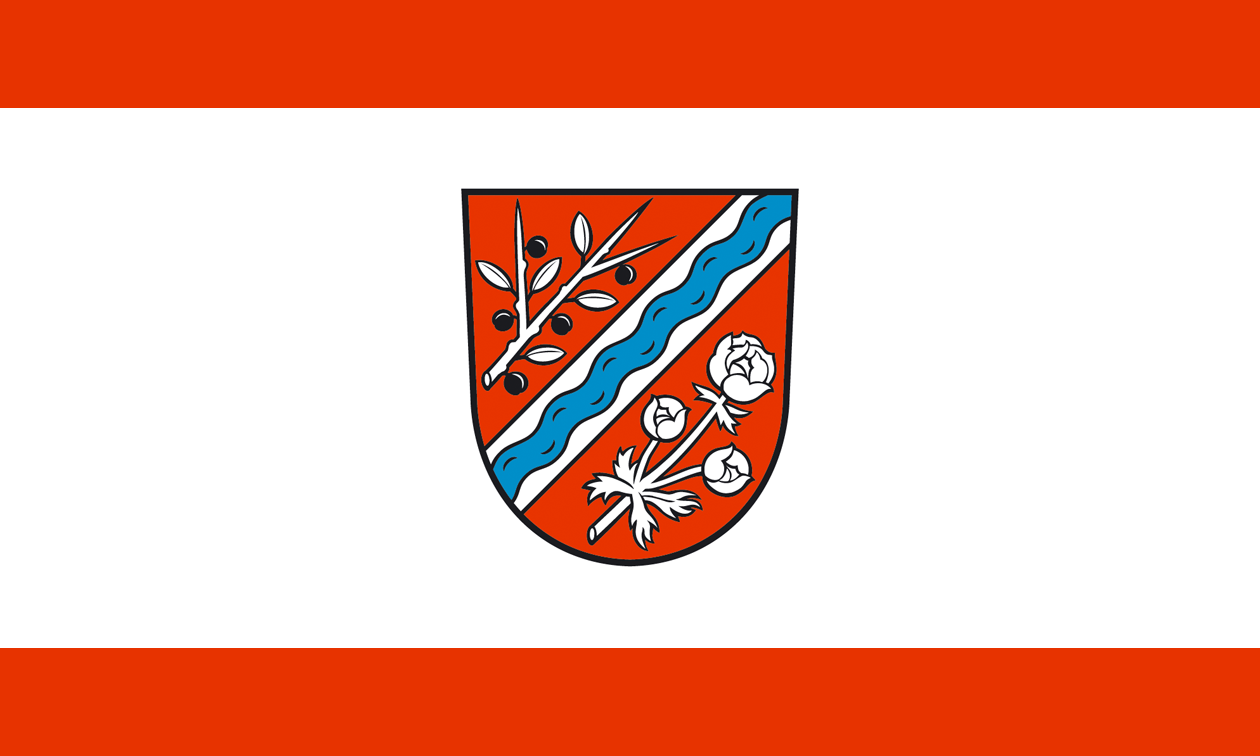
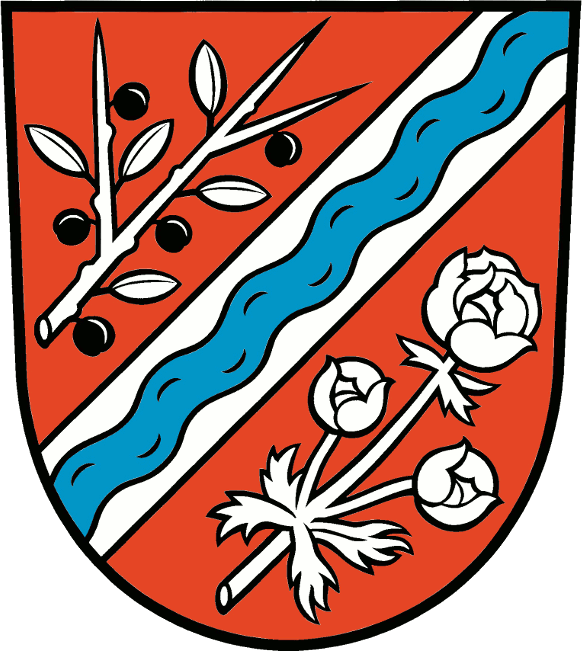
- Flag Coat of arms

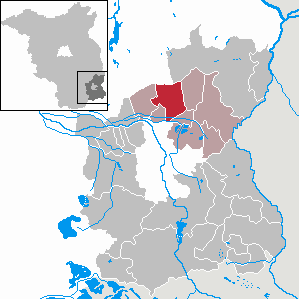
- Location of Turnow-Preilack within Spree-Neiße district
- Interactive map of Turnow-Preilack
- Location within Germany Location within Brandenburg
- Coordinates: 51°52′00″N 14°24′00″E
- Country: Germany
- State: Brandenburg
- District: Spree-Neiße
- Municipal assoc.: Peitz
- Subdivisions: 2 Ortsteile

Government
  - Mayor (2024–29): René Sonke

Area
  - Total: 38.02 km^{2} (14.68 sq mi)
- Elevation: 59 m (194 ft)

Population (2025-12-31)
  - Total: 1,094
  - Density: 28.77/km^{2} (74.53/sq mi)
- Time zone: UTC+01:00 (CET)
  - Summer (DST): UTC+02:00 (CEST)
- Postal codes: 03185
- Dialling codes: 035601
- Vehicle registration: SPN

Turnow-Preilack (Lower Sorbian: Turnow-Pśiłuk) is a municipality in the district of Spree-Neiße, in Lower Lusatia, Brandenburg, Germany.

== History ==
The municipality of Turnow-Preilack was formed on 31 December 2001 by merging the municipalities of Turnow and Preilack.

From 1815 to 1947, Turnow and Preilack were part of the Prussian Province of Brandenburg.

After World War II, Turnow and Preilack were incorporated into the State of Brandenburg from 1947 to 1952 and the Bezirk Cottbus of East Germany from 1952 to 1990. Since 1990, they have been part of Brandenburg, since 2001 united as the municipality of Turnow-Preilack.

== Demography ==
Development of Population since 1875 within the Current Boundaries (Blue Line: Population; Dotted Line: Comparison to Population Development of Brandenburg state; Grey Background: Time of Nazi rule; Red Background: Time of Communist rule)

Turnow-Preilack: Population development
within the current boundaries (2017)

Year	Pop.	±% p.a.
1875	879	—
1890	1,226	+2.24%
1910	1,236	+0.04%
1925	1,202	−0.19%
1933	1,234	+0.33%
1939	1,251	+0.23%
1946	1,542	+3.03%
1950	1,505	−0.61%
1964	1,297	−1.06%
1971	1,291	−0.07%
1981	1,181	−0.89%
1985	1,161	−0.43%
1989	1,143	−0.39%
1990	1,122	−1.84%

Year	Pop.	±% p.a.
1991	1,120	−0.18%
1992	1,109	−0.98%
1993	1,109	+0.00%
1994	1,138	+2.61%
1995	1,173	+3.08%
1996	1,236	+5.37%
1997	1,262	+2.10%
1998	1,282	+1.58%
1999	1,302	+1.56%
2000	1,291	−0.84%
2001	1,290	−0.08%
2002	1,304	+1.09%
2003	1,294	−0.77%
2004	1,293	−0.08%

Year	Pop.	±% p.a.
2005	1,289	−0.31%
2006	1,269	−1.55%
2007	1,235	−2.68%
2008	1,233	−0.16%
2009	1,222	−0.89%
2010	1,204	−1.47%
2011	1,184	−1.66%
2012	1,163	−1.77%
2013	1,150	−1.12%
2014	1,145	−0.43%
2015	1,154	+0.79%
2016	1,147	−0.61%
2017	1,145	−0.17%
