= Cottbus-Drewitz Airport =

Former German aerodrome in Jänschwalde-Drewitz

Cottbus-Drewitz Airport Flugplatz Cottbus-Drewitz
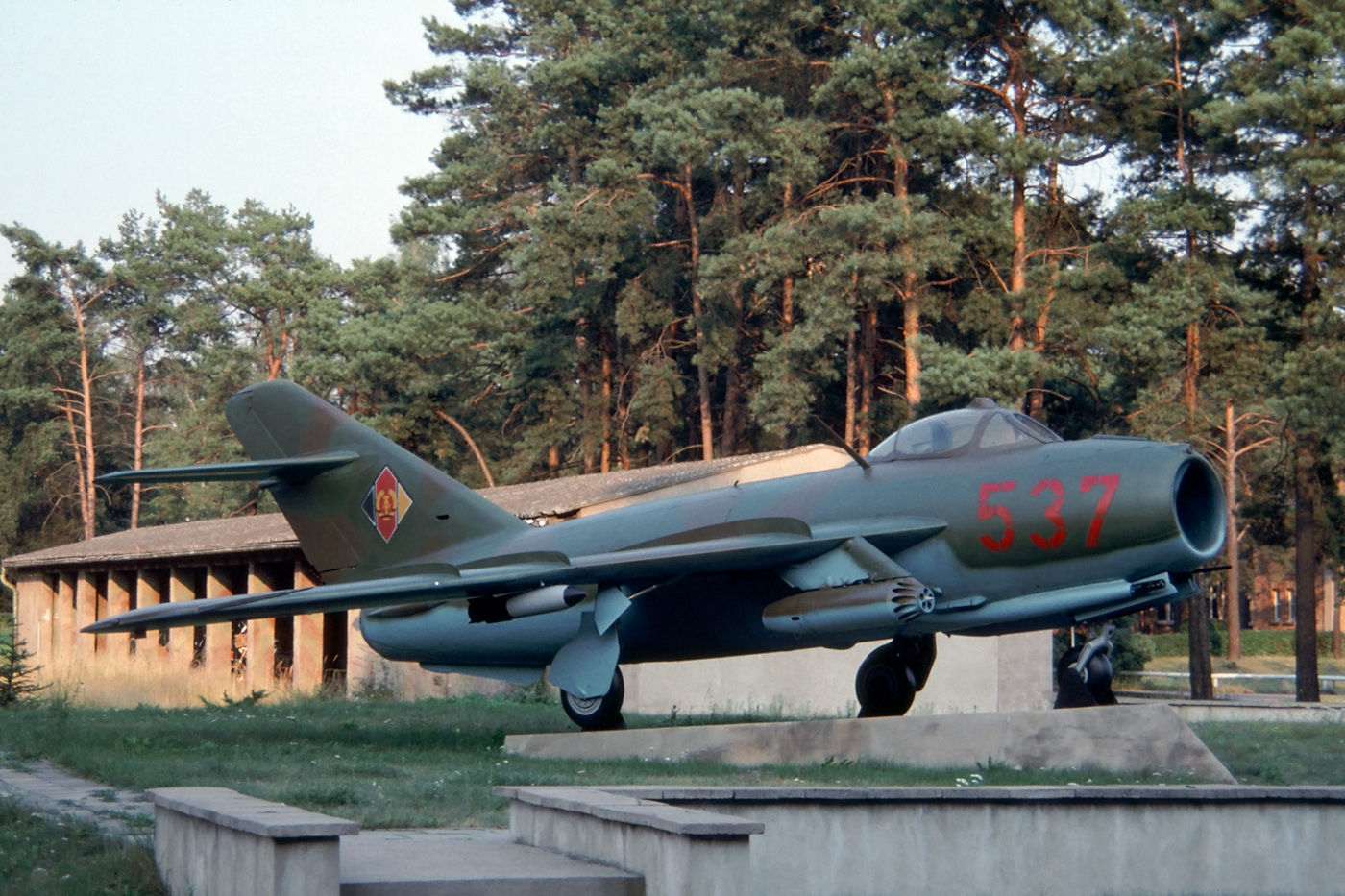
- IATA: CBU; ICAO: EDCD

Summary
- Airport type: Civilian
- Operator: Flughafen Süd- Brandenburg-Cottbus GmbH
- Serves: Cottbus
- Location: Jänschwalde-Drewitz
- Built: 1939
- Elevation AMSL: 276 ft (84 m)
- Coordinates: 51°53′22″N 14°31′55″E
- Website: www.flugplatz-drewitz.de

Map
- Location of airport in Germany

Runways
| Direction | Length | | Surface |
| Direction | ft | m | Surface |
|---|---|---|---|
| 07/25 | 8,148 | 2,484 | Concrete |
| 07L/25R | 4,918 | 1,499 | Grass |

Cottbus-Drewitz Airport (IATA: CBU, ICAO: EDCD) was a civilian airport located in Drewitz, an Ortsteil of Jänschwalde, approximately 25 kilometres (16 mi) north-east of Cottbus in Brandenburg, Germany.

== History ==
During World War II, Cottbus-Drewitz Airport was used by the Luftwaffe and from 1956 by the National People's Army. Upon German reunification in 1990, the Luftwaffe officially took over the airport once again but after 1993, the airport's new owners, Flughafen Süd-Brandenburg-Cottbus GmbH, opened it for civilian use. In April 2000 a new control tower was opened.

The airport was most often used for charter flights for the football team FC Energie Cottbus, but was also used for training flights by TUIfly, Lufthansa and Germania.

In late May 2012, a grass strip at the airport was used to conduct unpaved runway trials of the Airbus A400M military airlifter. Although Airbus Military had examined the grass strip and believed it suitable, testing was cut short when the test aircraft penetrated the runway surface during a rejected takeoff test. The test aircraft departed undamaged.

Aside from a bistro serving the terminal, there was also a small aviation museum and flying school. Runway 07's centerline latitude is 51.885409 degrees and the longitude is 14.515136. Runway 25's centerline latitude is 51.893514 while the longitude is 14.549012 degrees.

The airport closed to all air traffic for the final time on 31 January 2020. Due to investors pulling out, there have been several failed attempts to turn the civilian airport into a freight hub with a 3000 m runway, similar in concept to Frankfurt-Hahn.
