= Drachhausen =

Drachhausen Hochoza
- Municipality
- Coat of arms

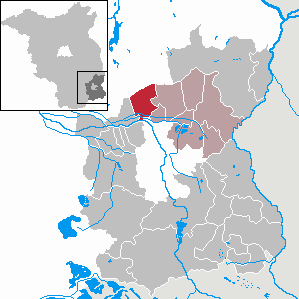
- Location of Drachhausen within Spree-Neiße district
- Interactive map of Drachhausen
- Location within Germany Location within Brandenburg
- Coordinates: 51°53′59″N 14°19′00″E
- Country: Germany
- State: Brandenburg
- District: Spree-Neiße
- Municipal assoc.: Peitz

Government
  - Mayor (2024–29): Ronny Henke

Area
  - Total: 38.37 km^{2} (14.81 sq mi)
- Elevation: 61 m (200 ft)

Population (2025-12-31)
  - Total: 732
  - Density: 19.1/km^{2} (49.4/sq mi)
- Demonym(s): German: Drachhausener; Lower Sorbian: Hochozar (m.), Hochozarka (f.)
- Time zone: UTC+01:00 (CET)
  - Summer (DST): UTC+02:00 (CEST)
- Postal codes: 03185
- Dialling codes: 035609
- Vehicle registration: SPN

Drachhausen ([ˈdʁaxˌhaʊzn̩]; Lower Sorbian: Hochoza, pronounced [ˈhɔxɔza]) is a municipality in the district of Spree-Neiße, in Lower Lusatia, Brandenburg, Germany.

== History ==
From 1815 to 1947, Drachhausen was part of the Prussian Province of Brandenburg.

After World War II, Drachhausen was incorporated into the State of Brandenburg from 1947 to 1952 and the Bezirk Cottbus of East Germany from 1952 to 1990. Since 1990, Drachhausen has been part of Brandenburg.

== Demography ==
Development of Population since 1875 within the Current Boundaries (Blue Line: Population; Dotted Line: Comparison to Population Development of Brandenburg state; Grey Background: Time of Nazi rule; Red Background: Time of Communist rule)

Drachhausen: Population development
within the current boundaries (2013)

| Year | Pop. | ±% p.a. |
|---|---|---|
| 1875 | 1,116 | — |
| 1890 | 1,171 | +0.32% |
| 1910 | 1,238 | +0.28% |
| 1925 | 1,245 | +0.04% |
| 1933 | 1,220 | −0.25% |
| 1939 | 1,161 | −0.82% |
| 1946 | 1,480 | +3.53% |
| 1950 | 1,414 | −1.13% |
| 1964 | 1,168 | −1.36% |
| 1971 | 1,150 | −0.22% |
| 1981 | 990 | −1.49% |
| 1985 | 953 | −0.95% |
| 1989 | 912 | −1.09% |
| 1990 | 902 | −1.10% |
| 1991 | 888 | −1.55% |
| 1992 | 873 | −1.69% |
| 1993 | 867 | −0.69% |
| 1994 | 877 | +1.15% |
| 1995 | 877 | +0.00% |
| 1996 | 884 | +0.80% |

| Year | Pop. | ±% p.a. |
|---|---|---|
| 1997 | 897 | +1.47% |
| 1998 | 902 | +0.56% |
| 1999 | 889 | −1.44% |
| 2000 | 889 | +0.00% |
| 2001 | 893 | +0.45% |
| 2002 | 887 | −0.67% |
| 2003 | 861 | −2.93% |
| 2004 | 840 | −2.44% |
| 2005 | 854 | +1.67% |
| 2006 | 856 | +0.23% |
| 2007 | 848 | −0.93% |
| 2008 | 855 | +0.83% |
| 2009 | 836 | −2.22% |
| 2010 | 843 | +0.84% |
| 2011 | 846 | +0.36% |
| 2012 | 838 | −0.95% |
| 2013 | 829 | −1.07% |
| 2014 | 814 | −1.81% |
| 2015 | 816 | +0.25% |
| 2016 | 804 | −1.47% |
