= Heinz Schuster-Šewc =

German linguist (1927–2021)

Heinz Schuster-Šewc (Sorbian Hinc Šewc; 8 February, 1927 in Purschwitz – 10 February, 2021 in Leipzig) was a German Sorbian Slavicist and university professor.

After studying Slavic studies, he did his PhD and habilitation. From 1964, he was professor for Sorbian Studies and Slavic linguistics as well as director of the Instituts für Sorabistik at Leipzig University. He was awarded an honorary doctorate by the Jagiellonian University. From 1988 up to his death, he had been a member of the Saxon Academy of Sciences. He was also a member of the Polish Academy of Arts and Sciences in Kraków.

== Publications ==
- Vergleichende historische Lautlehre der Sprache des Albin Moller, Berlin, Akademie-Verlag, 1958.
- Bibliographie der sorbischen Sprachwissenschaft, Bautzen, Domowina-Verlag, 1966.
- Sorbische Sprachdenkmäler 16. bis 18. Jahrhundert, Bautzen, Domowina-Verlag, 1967.
- Gramatika hornjoserbskeje rěče: Zwjazk. 1: Fonologija, fonetika, morfologija, Budyšin, Nakładnistwo Domowina, 1968 and 1984 (2. vyd.).
- Gramatika hornjoserbskeje rěče: Zwjazk. 2: Syntaksa, Budyšin, Nakładnistwo Domowina, 1976.
- Historisch-etymologisches Wörterbuch der ober- und niedersorbischen Sprache, Bautzen, Domowina-Verlag, 1978–1996. Bd. 1–5.
- Das Sorbische und der Stand seiner Erforschung, Berlin, Akademie-Verlag, 1991.
- Das Sorbische im slawischen Kontext, Domowina-Verlag, 2000.
- Die ältesten Drucke des Obersorbischen, Bautzen, Domowina-Verlag, 2001.
