= Tuplice =

- Village
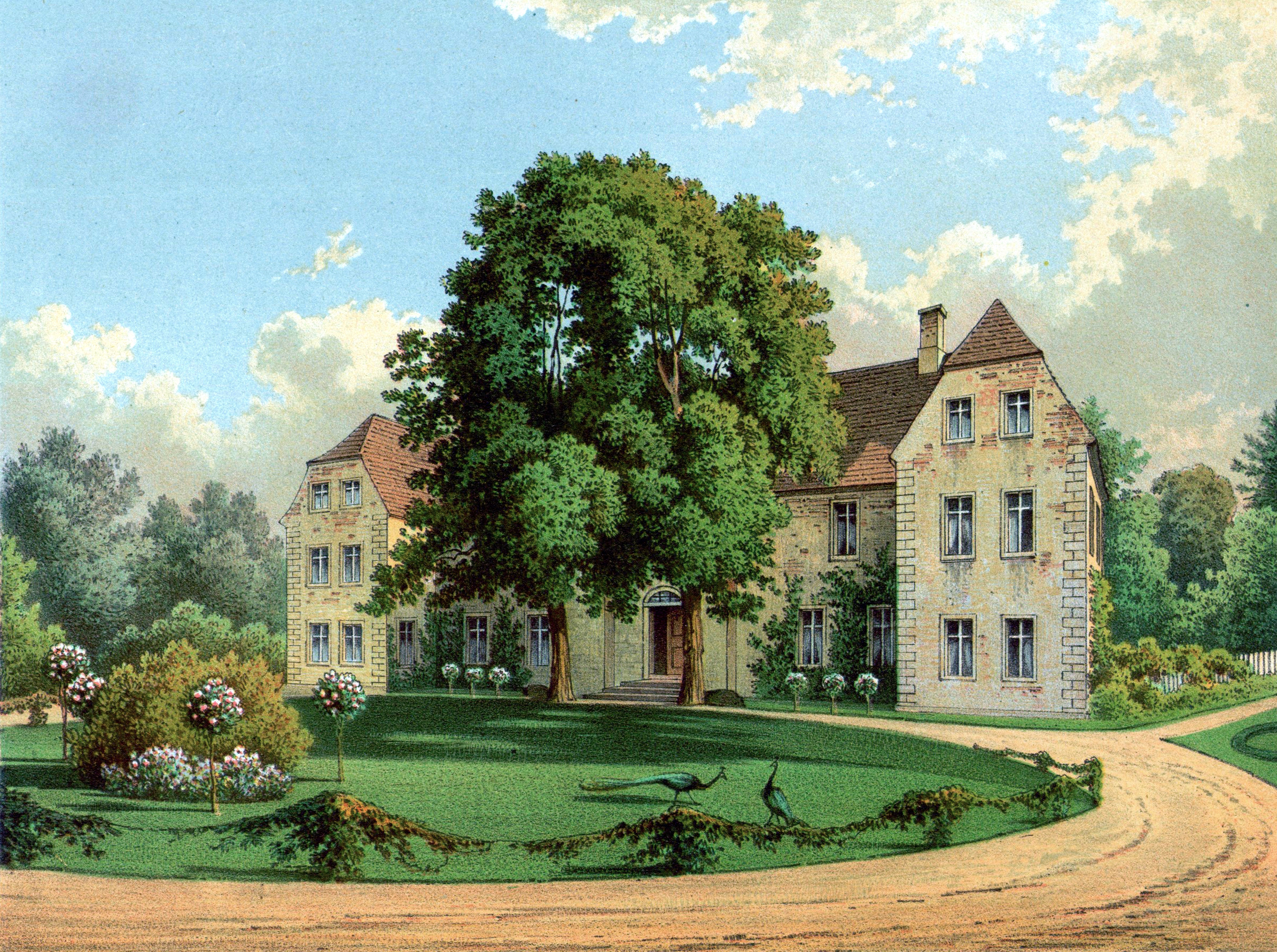
- 1860 painting by Alexander Duncker

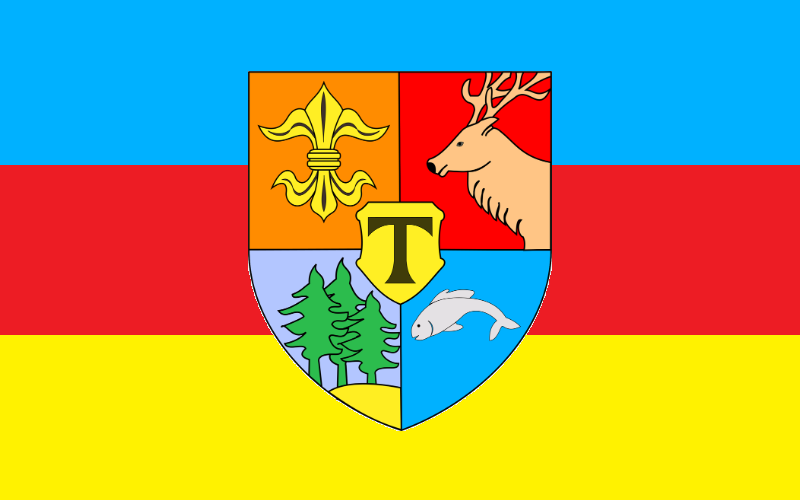
- Flag Coat of arms

- Location within Poland
- Coordinates: 51°41′N 14°50′E
- Country: Poland
- Voivodeship: Lubusz
- County: Żary
- Gmina: Tuplice
- Population: 1,324
- Postal code: 68-219
- Area code: +48 68
- Vehicle registration: FZA

Tuplice [tuˈplit͡sɛ] (German: Teuplitz; Lower Sorbian: Dublice) is a village in the administrative district of Gmina Tuplice, within Żary County, Lubusz Voivodeship in western Poland.

== History ==
From 1815, the village was part of Prussia; a glassworks and a brickyard date to this period. Until 1945, Teuplitz was part of the Brandenburg district of Sorau (Żagań). The railway lines Cottbus–Sorau and Lubsko–Muskau, built by the Lusatian Railway Company, made the place an important railway junction of Lower Lusatia. In 1933, the village had a population of 1,381, which increased to 1,439 in 1939.

In the village of Świbinki, there was a Hakhshara camp for young Jews from 1938 to 1939, which prepared them for emigration to Palestine by teaching agriculture.

In consequences to World War II, the village was partially destroyed in 1945. After World War II, the area came under Polish administration and was renamed to Tuplice.

== Transport ==
Tuplice is home to Tuplice railway station.

== Notable residents ==
- Siegmund Adrian von Rothenburg (1745–1797), entomologist
- Ernst Theodor Schulze (1859–1919), classical philologist and teacher
- Herbert Tzschoppe (1927–2023), politician
