= Lipinki Łużyckie railway station =

Railway station in Lipinki Łużyckie, western Poland

Lipinki Łużyckie
- Station in March 2018

General information
- Location: Lipinki Łużyckie, Lubusz Voivodeship; Poland
- Coordinates: 51°38′57.0″N 15°00′35.0″E
- Owner: Polish State Railways
- Line: Łódź Kaliska–Zasieki
- Platforms: 1

History
- Opened: 30 April 1872
- Former names: Linderode (1872–1945); Lipinki (1945–1946); Lipinki Śląskie (1946–1947)

Services
Preceding station	KD	Following station
Sieniawa Żarska towards Wrocław Główny	D14	Tuplice Dębinka towards Forst (Lausitz)
Preceding station	Polregio	Following station
Sieniawa Żarska towards Małomice	PR	Tuplice Dębinka towards Forst (Lausitz)
Location
- Location within Poland

Lipinki Łużyckie is a railway station in the village of Lipinki Łużyckie, Żary County within the Lubusz Voivodeship in western Poland.

== History ==
The station was opened as Linderode on 30 April 1872. It originally had two platforms with a station building. After World War II, the area came under Polish administration. As a result, the station was taken over by Polish State Railways and was renamed to Lipinki. After one of the line's tracks were dismantled by the Red Army—downgrading it to a single-track railway—one of the platforms were abandoned, with now one in use.

The station was renamed to Lipinki Śląskie in 1946 for designation, and was renamed to its modern name, Lipinki Łużyckie, in 1947. The entire station building complex was demolished in the late 1990s; downgrading Lipinki Łużyckie to a railway halt.

== Train services ==
Train services are operated by Lower Silesian Railways (KD) and the Lubusz branch of Polregio (PR).

The station is served by the following services:

- Regional services (KD) Wrocław - Legnica - Żary - Forst (Lausitz)
- Regional services (PR) Małomice - Forst (Lausitz)
