= Tuplice Dębinka railway station =

Railway station in Dębinka, western Poland

Tuplice Dębinka
- Station in May 1992

General information
- Location: Dębinka, Lubusz Voivodeship; Poland
- Coordinates: 51°39′58.2″N 14°54′36.0″E
- Owner: PKP Polskie Linie Kolejowe
- Line: Łódź Kaliska–Zasieki
- Platforms: 1

History
- Opened: 1 February 1891
- Former names: Tzschecheln (1891–1937); Eichenrode (Niederlausitz) (1937–1945); Czechlin (1945–1947); Dębinka (1947–1975)

Services
Preceding station	KD	Following station
Lipinki Łużyckie towards Wrocław Główny	D14	Tuplice towards Forst (Lausitz)
Preceding station	Polregio	Following station
Lipinki Łużyckie towards Małomice	PR	Tuplice towards Forst (Lausitz)
Location
- Location within Poland

Tuplice Dębinka is a railway station in the village of Dębinka, Żary County within the Lubusz Voivodeship in western Poland.

== History ==
The station was opened on 1 February 1891 as Tszchecheln. It was renamed to Eichenrode (Niederlausitz) in 1937. After World War II, the area came under Polish administration. As a result, the station was taken over by Polish State Railways and was renamed to Czechlin. It was renamed to Dębinka in 1947, and eventually to its modern name, Tuplice Dębinka, in 1975.

After the war, the station served as a border checkpoint with a customs office for freight trains heading to and from Germany. The station building was demolished in 2007, downgrading Tuplice Dębinka to a railway halt.

== Train services ==
Train services are operated by Lower Silesian Railways (KD) and the Lubusz branch of Polregio (PR).

The station is served by the following services:

- Regional services (KD) Wrocław - Legnica - Żary - Forst (Lausitz)
- Regional services (PR) Małomice - Forst (Lausitz)

== See also ==
- Tuplice railway station
