= Tuplice railway station =

Railway station in Tuplice, western Poland

Tuplice

General information
- Location: Tuplice, Lubusz Voivodeship; Poland
- Coordinates: 51°40′19.3″N 14°50′12.5″E
- Owner: PKP Polskie Linie Kolejowe
- Line: Łódź Kaliska–Zasieki
- Platforms: 4

History
- Opened: 30 June 1872
- Former names: Teuplitz (1872–1945)

Services
Preceding station	KD	Following station
Tuplice Dębinka towards Wrocław Główny	D14	Zasieki towards Forst (Lausitz)
Preceding station	Polregio	Following station
Tuplice Dębinka towards Małomice	PR	Zasieki towards Forst (Lausitz)
Location
- Location within Poland

Tuplice is a railway station in the village of Tuplice, Żary County within the Lubusz Voivodeship in western Poland.

== History ==
The station opened as Teuplitz on 30 June 1872. In 1897, the Lusatian Railway Company (LEG) opened the Stary Raduszec–Bad Muskau railway, making Tuplice a railway junction. After World War II, the area came under Polish administration. As a result, the station was taken over by Polish State Railways and was renamed to Tuplice. Passenger services resumed in July 1946.

The Stary Raduszec–Bad Muskau railway closed to passenger services in sections in 1990 and 1996. It closed to freight traffic in 2000. During its operation, services called at the station's platforms 1 and 2. LEG's train depot was also based at the station.

== Train services ==
Train services are operated by Lower Silesian Railways (KD) and the Lubusz branch of Polregio (PR).

The station is served by the following services:

- Regional services (KD) Wrocław - Legnica - Żary - Forst (Lausitz)
- Regional services (PR) Małomice - Forst (Lausitz)

== See also ==
- Lusatian Railway Company
