= China–East Germany relations =

- China: East Germany

China–East Germany relations refers to historical foreign and bilateral relations between the People's Republic of China (PRC) and the German Democratic Republic (East Germany). Diplomatic relations were established on 27 October 1949, shortly after the establishment of both the PRC and the GDR, and were maintained until German reunification on 3 October 1990.

== History ==
The People's Republic of China was proclaimed by Mao Zedong in 1949, the same year that Germany Democratic Republic was founded. Due to their shared socialist orientation, both states established diplomatic relations in the first year of their existence. Both states subsequently established trade relations. Until 1971, the GDR remained the only German state with diplomatic relations with the People's Republic. The German Democratic Republic had good relations with the PRC, despite the Sino-Soviet Split that occurred for most of the Cold War until the 1989 Sino-Soviet Summit. However, the split strained relations with the GDR, which, like most socialist states, sided with the Soviets.

Since the March 1982 speech on Sino-Soviet rapprochement by General Secretary Leonid Brezhnev to the Communist Party of Uzbekistan in Tashkent, Sino-East German relations began to steadily improve. In June 1986, Foreign Minister Wu Xueqian visited East Berlin in the highest-level Chinese delegation to Eastern Europe since the 1961 split. Moreover, Chairman Erich Honecker visited Beijing in early October 1986, where he was met by Chinese President Li Xiannian with in a welcoming ceremony on Tiananmen Square a military band and a marchpast by the People's Liberation Army honor guard. The visit became the first official visit by an Eastern Bloc leader to the PRC. During the visit, Honecker tried to mediate between the Soviet Union and the People's Republic. When the Tiananmen square massacre occurred in 1989, the GDR approved the violence against the demonstrators in Beijing. The Volkskammer passed a resolution in which the GDR announced its support for the suppression of the “counter-revolutionary unrest”. In October 1989, Chinese Vice Premier Yao Yilin visited East Germany to attend the military parade commemorating the 40th anniversary of the GDR. The first freely elected Volkskammer reversed the resolution supporting China's actions in Tiananmen Square in 1990 and condemned the violence.
