= Wiesenthal (disambiguation) =

Wiesenthal is a municipality in Thuringia, Germany

Wiesenthal or Wiesental may also refer to:

== Places ==
- Oberwiesenthal, a town and ski resort in Erzgebirgs District, Saxony, Germany, known as Wiesenthal
- Wiesenthal an der Neiße, an old name of Lučany nad Nisou in the Czech Republic
- Wiesenthal, Bohemia, an old name for Loučná pod Klínovcem in the Czech Republic
- Wiesenthal, Brandenburg, an old name for Chlebice in Poland
- Wiesenthal, East Prussia, an old name for Bachorza, Warmian-Masurian Voivodeship in Poland
- Wiesenthal, Pomerania, an old name for Święcianowo in Poland
- Wiesenthal, Posnan, an old name for Skoraczewo, Greater Poland Voivodeship

=== Silesia ===
- Wiesenthal, Frankenstein, Silesia, an old name for Wadochowice in Silesia, Poland
- Wiesenthal, Löwenberg, Silesia, an old name for Bystrzyca, Lwówek Śląski County, in Silesia, Poland
- Wiesenthal, Militsch, Silesia, an old name for Ostrowąsy, Lower Silesian Voivodeship, Poland

=== Wiesental ===
- Wiesental, Austria, a valley in Mistelbach District, Lower Austria 48°35′39″N 016°40′51″E
- Wiesental, Black Forest, valley of the river Wiese, in the Southern Black Forest
- Wiesental (Baden)
- Wiesenttal, a municipality in Forchheim District, Bavaria, Germany
- Wisental, Switzerland, a valley in Hombrechtikon, Meilen District, Zurich Canton, Switzerland

=== Outer space ===
- 69275 Wiesenthal (1989 WD4), an asteroid

== Family name ==
- Charles Fredrick Wiesenthal (1726–1789), one of the inventors of the sewing machine
- Grete Wiesenthal (1885–1970), an Austrian dancer and choreographer
- Simon Wiesenthal (1908–2005), a Jewish Galician-Austrian who became a Nazi hunter after surviving the Holocaust
  - Kreisky-Peter-Wiesenthal affair
  - Simon Wiesenthal Center
- Helmut Wiesenthal (born 1938, Meuselwitz), a German sociologist, politologist (de)
- Mauricio Wiesenthal (born 1943), Spanish writer from, Barcelona
- Robert S. Wiesenthal (born 1966), an American businessman
