= East German Republic Day Parade of 1989 =

1989 parade on Karl-Marx-Allee

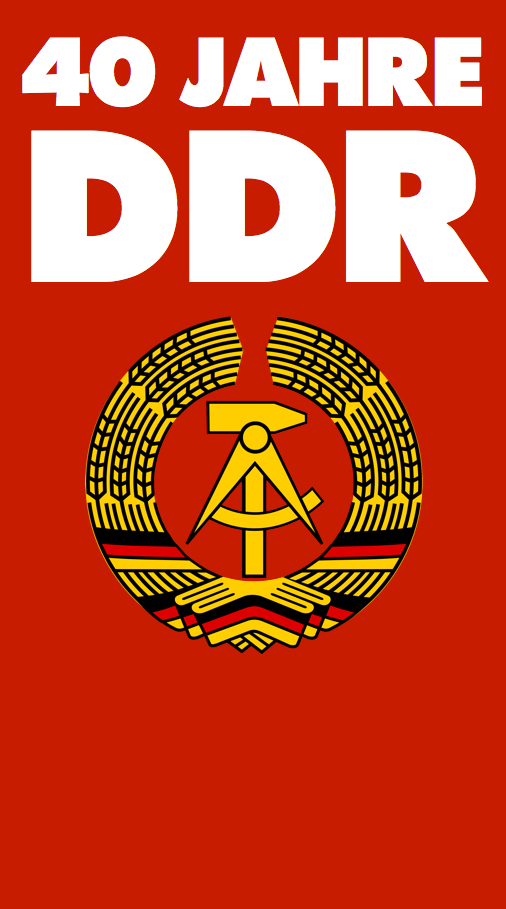
A banner in honor of the 40th anniversary of the GDR in 1989

The East German Republic Day Parade of 1989 (Ehrenparade der Nationalen Volksarmee zum 40. Jahrestag der DDR 1989) was a parade of the National People's Army on Karl-Marx-Allee (between Strausberger Platz and Alexanderplatz) in East Berlin on 7 October 1989 commemorating the 40th anniversary of the establishment of East Germany. This was the last East German Republic Day Parade and the last major East German political event with the regime falling mere weeks later.

== Description ==
Defense Minister Army General Heinz Kessler inspected the parade while accompanied by Deputy Minister of Defense, Colonel General Horst Stechbarth who commanded the parade. Military bands from the Military Music Service of the National People's Army representing three of the four services of the Nationale Volksarmee and the Corps of Drums of the Friedrich Engels Guard Regiment performed the military marches at the parade, including the Präsentiermarsch der Nationalen Volksarmee and the Parademarsch № 1 der Nationalen Volksarmee. The event was accompanied by protests and more than 1,000 demonstrators were arrested. The live transmission on television of the GDR was commented by the reporter Bert Sprafke.

There was also a naval parade (Flottenparade) of the NVA's Volksmarine in the port city of Rostock. It was led by Admiral Theodor Hoffmann, Commander of the Volksmarine.

== Attendees and international guests ==
=== GDR ===
- Erich Honecker, General Secretary of the SED and Chairman of the National Defence Council
- Willi Stoph, Chairman of the Council of Ministers
- Horst Sindermann, Volkskammer President
- General of the Army Heinz Kessler, Minister of Defense
- Margot Honecker, Minister of National Education and Spouse of the Chairman of the State Council
- Oskar Fischer, Minister of Foreign Affairs of the German Democratic Republic
- General of the Army Erich Mielke, Minister for State Security
- Hermann Axen, Member of the Politburo
- Hans-Joachim Böhme, Member of the Politburo
- Horst Dohlus, Member of the Politburo
- Werner Eberlein, First Secretary of the Socialist Unity Party in Bezirk Magdeburg
- Kurt Hager, Member of the Politburo and Chief Ideologist of the SED
- Joachim Herrmann, Member of the Politburo
- Werner Jarowinsky, Member of the Politburo
- Günther Kleiber, Member of the Politburo
- Egon Krenz, Member of the Politburo
- Werner Krolikowski, Member of the Politburo
- Günter Mittag, Member of the Politburo
- Siegfried Lorenz, First Secretary of the Socialist Unity Party in Bezirk Karl-Marx-Stadt
- Günter Schabowski, Member of the Politburo
- Harry Tisch, Chairman of the Free German Trade Union Federation
- Gerald Götting, Chairman of the Christian Democratic Union

=== Foreign ===
- Mikhail Gorbachev, General Secretary of the Communist Party and Chairman of the Supreme Soviet of the Soviet Union
- (Soviet Union) Raisa Gorbacheva, Spouse of General Secretary Gorbachev
- Nicolae Ceausescu, President of Romania
- Todor Zhivkov, Chairman of the State Council of Bulgaria
- (Hungary) Brunó Ferenc Straub, Chairman of the Presidential Council of the Hungarian People's Republic
- Jambyn Batmönkh, Chairman of the Presidium of the State Great Khural of Mongolia
- Wojciech Jaruzelski, President of Poland
- (Poland) Mieczysław Rakowski, First Secretary of the Polish United Workers' Party
- Daniel Ortega, President of Nicaragua
- Miloš Jakeš, General Secretary of the Communist Party of Czechoslovakia
- Yasser Arafat, President of the State of Palestine and Chairman of the Palestine Liberation Organization
- Yao Yilin, Vice Premier of China
- (Socialist Federal Republic of Yugoslavia) Momir Bulatović, President of the League of Communists of Montenegro

== Full order of the parade ==
- General of the Army Heinz Kessler, Minister of National Defense (parade reviewing inspector)
- Colonel General Horst Stechbarth, Deputy Minister of Defense and Commander of the Landstreitkraefte (parade commander)

=== Military bands ===
- Massed Military Bands of the NVA under the direction of the Senior Director of Music of the Military Music Service of the National People's Army, Colonel Heinz Häcker

=== Infantry column ===
- Cadets of the Friedrich Engels Military Academy
- Cadets of the Ernst Thälmann Officers' Academy of the Land Forces
- Cadets of the Franz Mehring Officers' Training School of the Air Force
- Cadets of the Rosa Luxemburg Officers' Academy of the Border Troops
- Cadets of the Karl Liebknecht Officers' Academy of the Volksmarine

=== Mobile column ===
- Members of the 40th Air Assault Regiment "Willi Sänger" in light airborne vehicles
- Members of the AB-1 Reconnaissance Battalion "Dr. Richard Sorge", 1st Motorized Rifle Division in armored personnel carriers
- Members of the 1st Motorized Rifle Division "Hans Beimler" in armored personnel carriers
- Mine launchers on trucks
- Rocket launchers
- 152mm howitzers towed by Tatra trucks
- Armored personnel carriers
- Anti-aircraft guns on tracked vehicles
- PR-23 "Julian Marchlewski" tank regiment in T-72 tanks
- Tank Destroyer Equipment
- amphibious 122mm self-propelled howitzers
- AR-1 "Rudolf Gyptner" artillery regiment with 152 mm howitzers
- Members of the NVA with anti-aircraft radar on wheeled armored vehicles
- 9K33-Osa weapon systems on BAZ-5937 type base vehicles
- 2K12-Kub weapon systems on ZIL-131 trucks
- 5th Air Defense Missile Regiment "Bernhard Bästlein" with 2K11 Krug weapon systems
- heavy anti-aircraft missiles, using trucks as tractors
- light anti-aircraft missiles on trucks
- 18th Coastal Missile Regiment “Waldemar Verner” with mobile launch ramps
- 9K79 and 9K714 on mobile launchers

== Gallery ==
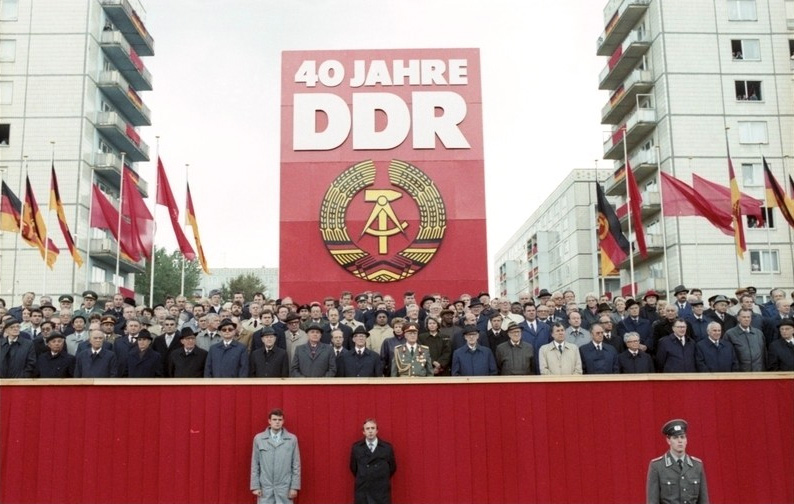

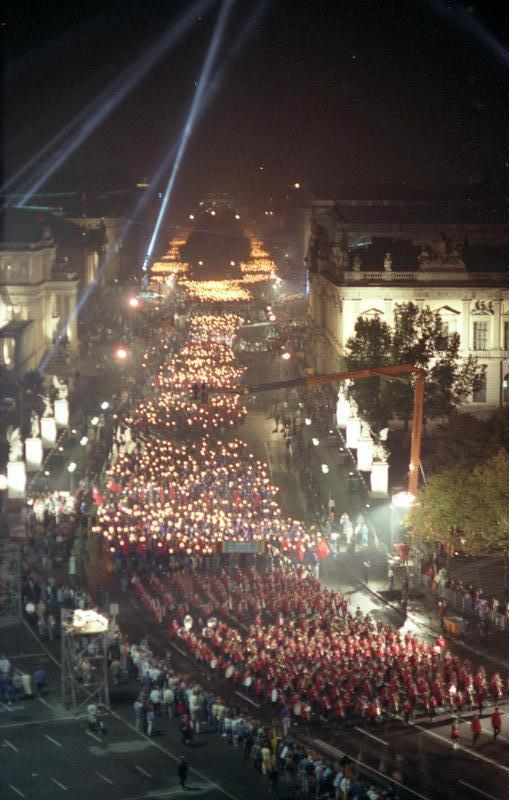

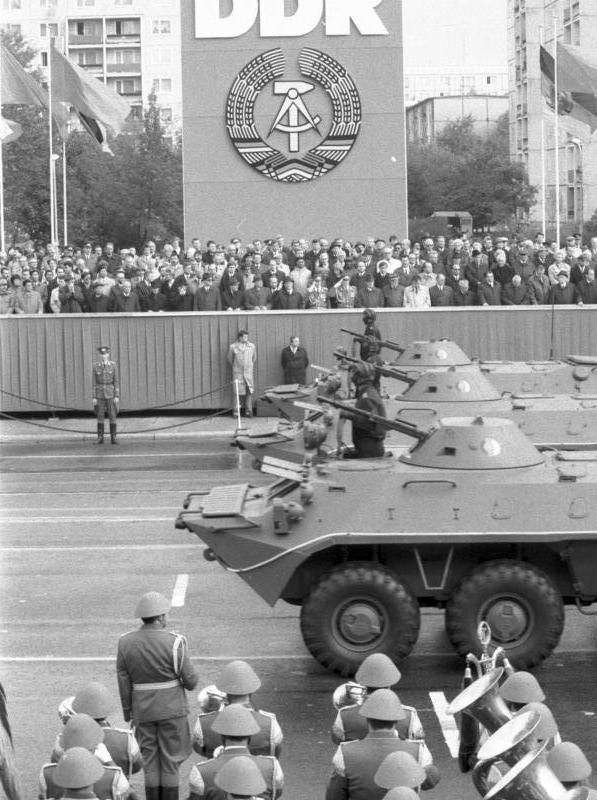

== See also ==
- Monday demonstrations in East Germany
- Revolutions of 1989
- National Day of the Rebirth of Poland
