= Zasieki =

- Village
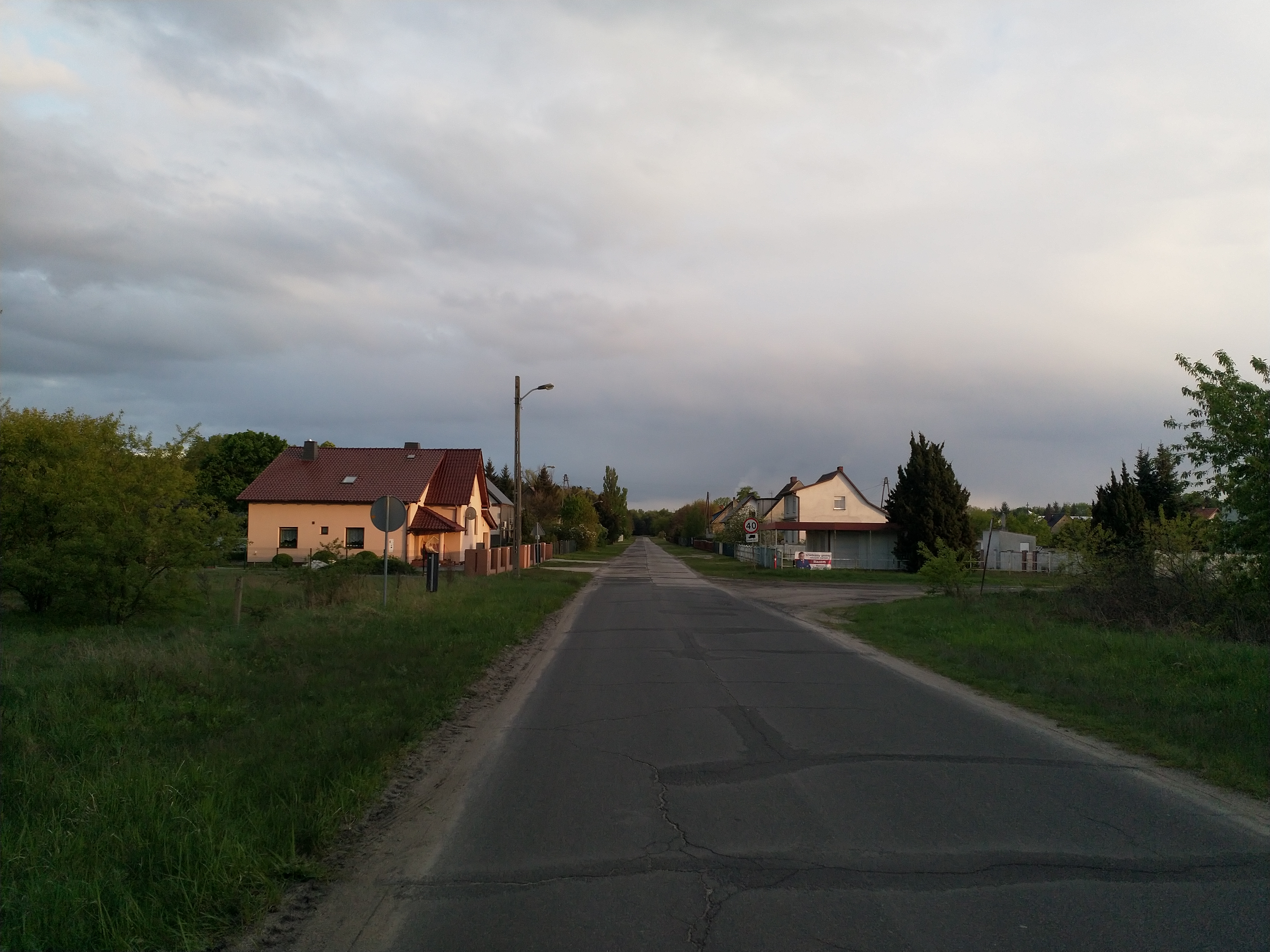

- Location within Poland
- Coordinates: 51°45′N 14°40′E
- Country: Poland
- Voivodeship: Lubusz
- County: Żary
- Gmina: Brody

Population
  - Total: 300
- Time zone: UTC+1 (CET)
  - Summer (DST): UTC+2 (CEST)
- Postal code: 68-343
- Vehicle registration: FZA

Zasieki [zaˈɕɛki] (Lower Sorbian: Štapaty Drot) is a village in the administrative district of Gmina Brody, within Żary County, Lubusz Voivodeship, in western Poland, on the border with Germany.

It lies on the Nysa Łużycka river opposite the German town of Forst. From 1897 to 1945, it was part of the town of Forst, known as Berge or Štapaty Drot. A road and railroad border crossing is located in Zasieki. Zasieki railway station serves the village.
