= Jagłowice =

- Village
- Location within Poland
- Coordinates: 51°39′08″N 14°49′34″E
- Country: Poland
- Voivodeship: Lubusz
- County: Żary
- Gmina: Tuplice
- Population: 110
- Time zone: UTC+1 (CET)
  - Summer (DST): UTC+2 (CEST)
- Vehicle registration: FZA

Jagłowice [jaɡwɔˈvit͡sɛ] (German: Jocksdorf) is a village in the administrative district of Gmina Tuplice, within Żary County, Lubusz Voivodeship, in western Poland.
