= Horst Stechbarth =

East German general

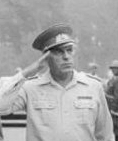
- Stechbarth in June 1984
- Born: 13 April 1925; Tzschecheln, Lower Lusatia, Weimar Germany (now Dębinka, Lubusz Voivodeship, Poland)
- Died: 8 June 2016 (aged 91); Schwielowsee, Germany
- Military career
- Allegiance: Nazi Germany; East Germany
- Branch: National People's Army
- Service years: 1943-1945; 1956–1989
- Rank: Generaloberst

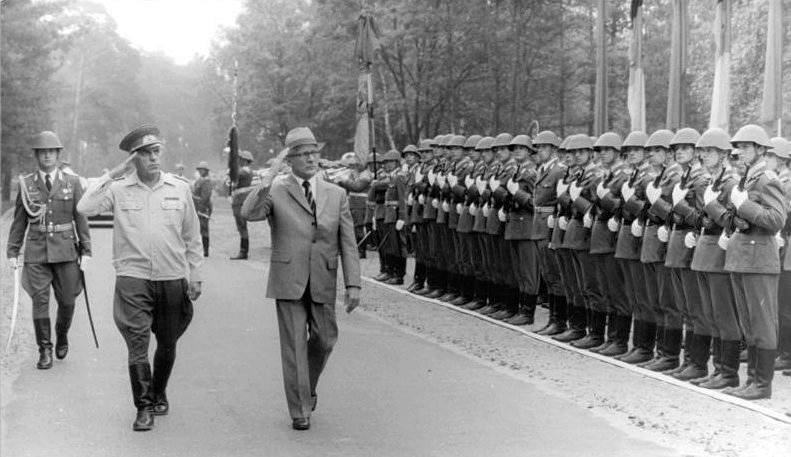
Stechbarth and General Secretary Erich Honecker inspecting troops of the Landstreitkräfte in 1984

Horst Stechbarth (13 April 1925 – 8 June 2016) was an East German politician and high-ranking military officer in the National People's Army (Nationale Volksarmee), holding the rank of Generaloberst (Colonel General). He was the Chief of the NVA's Landstreitkräfte and the ex officio Deputy Minister of Defense of the GDR. He was also a member of the Politbüro of the Central Committee of the ruling Socialist Unity Party of Germany (SED).

== Early life and career ==
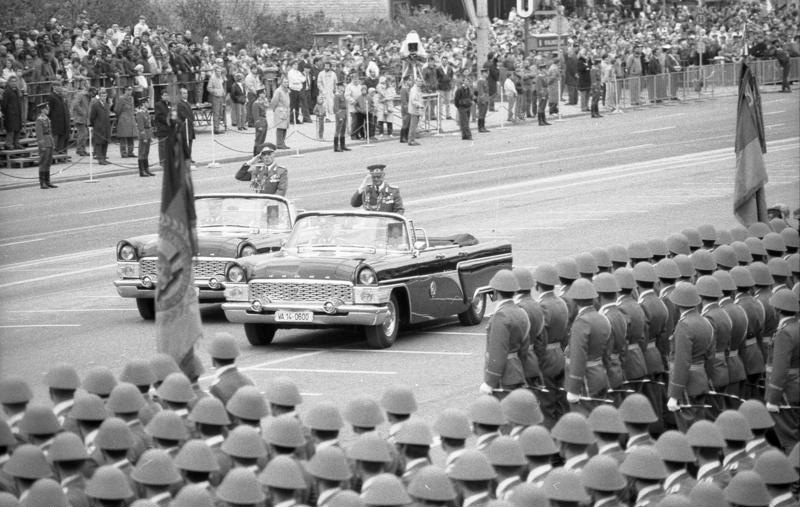
Stechbarth and Defense Minister Heinz Keßler (right) during the East German Republic Day Parade of 1988.

The son of a farmer, he was born on 13 April 1925 in Tzschecheln, Lower Lusatia, (now Dębinka, Poland). An agricultural assistant by profession, he worked on a farm from 1939 to 1943. He was drafted in 1943 to the Reich Labour Service and joined the Nazi Party the same year. From 1943 to 1945, he was a Panzergrenadier in the 3rd Panzer Division of the Wehrmacht. He served as a sergeant and was a prisoner of war in the Soviet Union from 1945 to 1948. After his return from captivity he worked on a farm. On 1 March 1949, Stehbarth entered the "Department of the Border Troops" and in the same year he joined the Free German Youth, became a member of the Socialist Unity Party of Germany (SED) by 1951.

From 1959 to 1961, Stechbarth studied at the Military Academy of the General Staff of the Armed Forces of the USSR. As a Major General he headed the 5th Military District in Neubrandenburg from 1964 to 1967. In 1972, Stechbarth was promoted to Chief of the Land Forces of the NVA. On the occasion of the 20th anniversary of the NVA on 1 March 1976, he was promoted to Colonel General and was appointed to the Central Committee of the SED. On 31 December 1989, after the fall of the Berlin Wall, Stechbarth retired, following his allies Wolfgang Reinhold and Horst Brünner. Just weeks earlier, Stechbarth commanded the Republic Day military parade on Karl Marx Allee celebrating the ruby jubilee of the GDR, held in front of National Defense Council Chairman Erich Honecker and Soviet Chairman Mikhail Gorbachev.

== Later life ==
He died on 8 June 2016 in his home town of Schwielowsee, a municipality in Brandenburg.

== Awards ==
- Patriotic Order of Merit Silver (1969)
- Patriotic Order of Merit Gold (1976)
- Patriotic Order of Merit of the NVA (1979)
- Scharnhorst Order (1981)
- Order of Karl Marx (1984)
