= Nowa Rola =

- Village
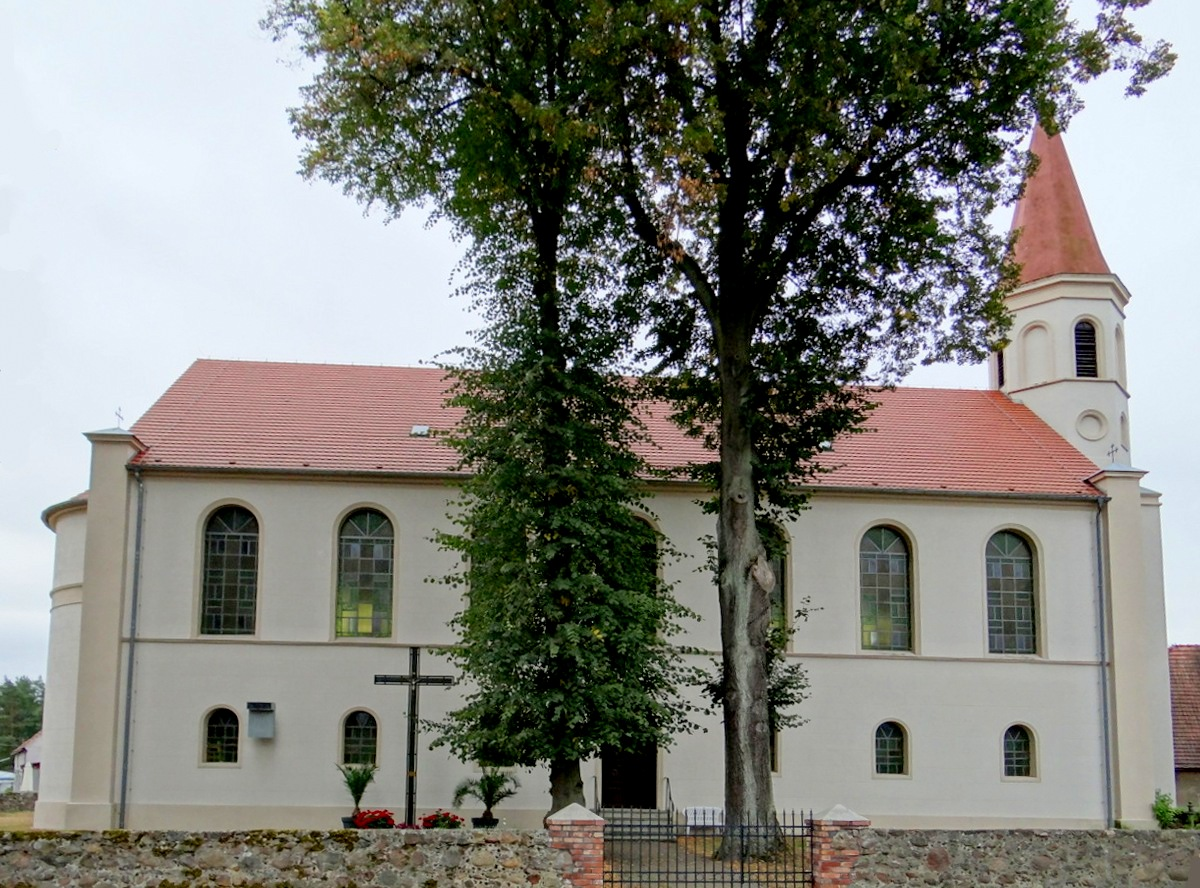
- Catholic church

- Location within Poland
- Coordinates: 51°44′N 14°53′E
- Country: Poland
- Voivodeship: Lubusz
- County: Żary
- Gmina: Tuplice

Nowa Rola [ˈnɔva ˈrɔla] (Lower Sorbian: Nowo Rulu; Upper Sorbian: Nowa Róla) is a village in the administrative district of Gmina Tuplice, within Żary County, Lubusz Voivodeship, in western Poland.
