= Heinrich Dollwetzel =

- Born: 30 March 1912; Hamburg, Germany
- Died: 23 April 1966 (aged 54); Berlin, East Germany
- Occupation(s): Major General (National People's Army)
- Parent: Max Dollwetzel (KPD official)

Heinrich Dollwetzel ( 30 March 1912 – 23 April 1966) was a Major general in East Germany's National People's Army. Prior to the army's foundation, he held several successive high ranks in the country's Kasernierte Volkspolizei (quasi-military police battalion).

== Life ==
Born into a working-class family, Dollwetzel began an industrial training as a fitter in 1926. His training was concluded in 1930. Between 1930 and 1933 he was unemployed: he joined the Communist Party in 1932. In January 1933 the NSDAP ("Nazi Party") took power in Germany. Later that year Dollwetzel emigrated via Denmark to the Soviet Union where he remained till 1937. He then, during 1937 and 1938, participated with the International Brigades in the Spanish Civil War as a tank commander on the Republican side. He returned to the Soviet Union in 1939, taking work as a fitter, and later working for the Soviet Interior Ministry.

He returned to what remained of Germany in 1948, not returning to Hamburg but settling in the Soviet occupation zone. He joined the Police service as well as the recently formed Socialist Unity Party (SED / Sozialistische Einheitspartei Deutschlands). In 1949 the area under Soviet administration was refounded as the Soviet sponsored standalone German Democratic Republic. There was still no German army in existence, but Dollwetzel was able to join the "Kasernierte Volkspolizei", a quasi-military police unit which in 1956 formed the basis for a new National People's Army. During the early 1950s he achieved a succession of rapid promotions, serving from August 1954 till November 1955, with the rank of colonel, as deputy chief of the "Kasernierte Volkspolizei" with special responsibility for training and educational establishments. On 1 November 1954 he was appointed General Inspector of the overall unit. In 1956, the year of the army's foundation, he became a member of the College of the Defence Ministry, also appointed first deputy minister for National Defence. From 1956 till 1958 he headed the Office Training Schools in Döbeln and Plauen, before in 1958 being appointed head of the Friedrich Engels Military Academy in Dresden. However, in 1959 he was transferred to the reserve list on health grounds. In 1960 he briefly returned to full-time work as deputy head of the Training Department in the Defence Ministry, but on 30 June 1961 he was permanently released from military service. He died in Berlin in 1966.

== Awards and honours ==
- 1955 Patriotic Order of Merit in silver
