= Łazy, Żary County =

Łazy
- Village
- Location within Poland
- Coordinates: 51°41′N 14°51′E
- Country: Poland
- Voivodeship: Lubusz
- County: Żary
- Gmina: Tuplice

Łazy [ˈwazɨ]; (Lower Sorbian: Gniły; Upper Sorbian: Lěni) is a village in the administrative district of Gmina Tuplice, within Żary County, Lubusz Voivodeship, in western Poland.

== Notable people ==
- Siegmund Adrian von Rothenburg, German lepidopterist
