= Gręzawa =

- Village
- Location within Poland
- Coordinates: 51°42′N 14°51′E
- Country: Poland
- Voivodeship: Lubusz
- County: Żary
- Gmina: Tuplice

Gręzawa [ɡrɛ̃ˈzava] is a village in the administrative district of Gmina Tuplice, within Żary County, Lubusz Voivodeship, in western Poland.
