= Hans Süß =

East german general

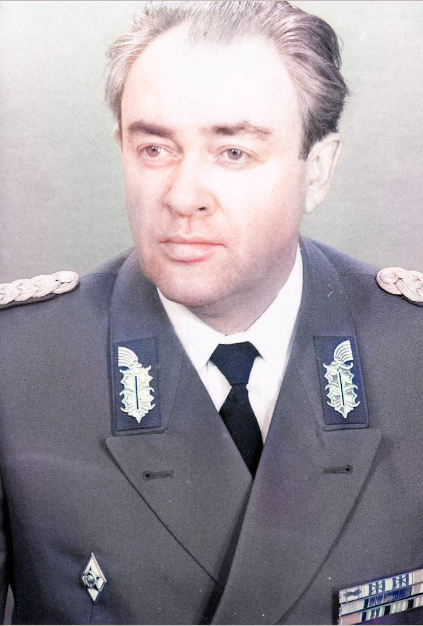

Chief of the Friedrich Engels Military Academy
- In office 1 March 1990 – 30 September 1990
- Preceded by: Manfred Gehmert
- Succeeded by: Gerhard Kolitsch

Inspector of the National People's Army
- In office 1988–1990

Personal details
- Born: 20 April 1935 Buchholz, Nazi Germany
- Died: 17 November 2009 (aged 74) Dresden, Germany
- Party: SED

Military service
- Allegiance: East Germany
- Branch/service: National People's Army
- Years of service: 1953-1990
- Rank: Lieutenant general

Hans Süß (20 April 1935 – 17 November 2009) was a German general of the National People's Army of East Germany. He was also a university professor and commanding officer of the Officers' College of the Air Force and Air Defense. He served as the Inspector of the National People's Army from 1988 to 1990 and Chief of the Friedrich Engels Military Academy in 1990.

== Early life and education ==
Hans Süß was born on April 20, 1935, in Buchholz and grew up in a working-class family. He attended school in Buchholz and passed his Abitur.

== Career ==
Süß voluntarily joined the Kasernierte Volkspolizei (KVP) on July 27, 1953, and completed an officer course at the KVP Officers' School in Dresden. He also became a member of the Socialist Unity Party in 1955.

He was transferred to the National People's Army at the beginning of 1956 and was appointed the first officer rank. He was then commanded to study a military academy in the Soviet Union. There, he trained in radar technology and graduated as a graduate engineer in 1960.

Upon his return from the Soviet Union, Süß served as the First Deputy of the Commander and then the Deputy of the Commander and Chief of Staff of the 4th Radio Regiment.

In 1962, he was transferred to the Kommando LSK/LV in Strausberg. There, he worked as the Deputy to the Chief of the Radio Troops from 1962 to 1965 and then the Chief of Radio Troops from 1965 to 1974.

From 1974 to 1976, he completed a general staff training at the Military Academy of the General Staff of the Armed Forces of Russia (then known as the Military Academy of the General Staff of the Armed Forces of the Soviet Union) in Moscow.

Süß was then transferred to the 1st Air Defense Division and worked there for two years.

On November 1, 1978, Süß became the successor to the position of Commander of the Officers' College of Air Force and Air Defense. On October 7, 1979, he was promoted to the rank of Major general. On October 7, 1988, he was promoted to the rank of Lieutenant general.

During the Peaceful Revolution, Hans Süß was recognized as Head of the Military Reform Commission and at the same time was the Secretary of the Government Commission on Military Reform in the German Democratic Republic. Military reform was designed under his leadership. He then briefly served as the Chief of the Friedrich Engels Military Academy from March 1, 1990, to September 30, 1990.

Süß was honorably discharged from the National People's Army before the dissolution of the National People's Army and the reunification of Germany.

After German reunification, Süß became a founding member of the Dresden Study Group on Security Policy and was a board member until 1991 and a member of association until 1994.

== Death ==
Hans Süß died on November 17, 2009, in Dresden. He was buried at the Kamenz cemetery.

== Awards ==
(East Germany) Patriotic Order of Merit (Bronze, 1970)

(East Germany) Scharnhorst Order

(East Germany) Battle medal "For services to the people and fatherland" (Gold)

(East Germany) Distinguished Service Medal of the National People's Army (Gold)
