= Czerna, Żary County =

Czerna
- Village
- Location within Poland
- Coordinates: 51°41′57″N 14°53′1″E
- Country: Poland
- Voivodeship: Lubusz
- County: Żary
- Gmina: Tuplice

Czerna [ˈt͡ʂɛrna] (Upper Sorbian: Čornja; Lower Sorbian: Čorna) is a village in the administrative district of Gmina Tuplice, within Żary County, Lubusz Voivodeship, in western Poland.
