= Lipinki Łużyckie =

- Village
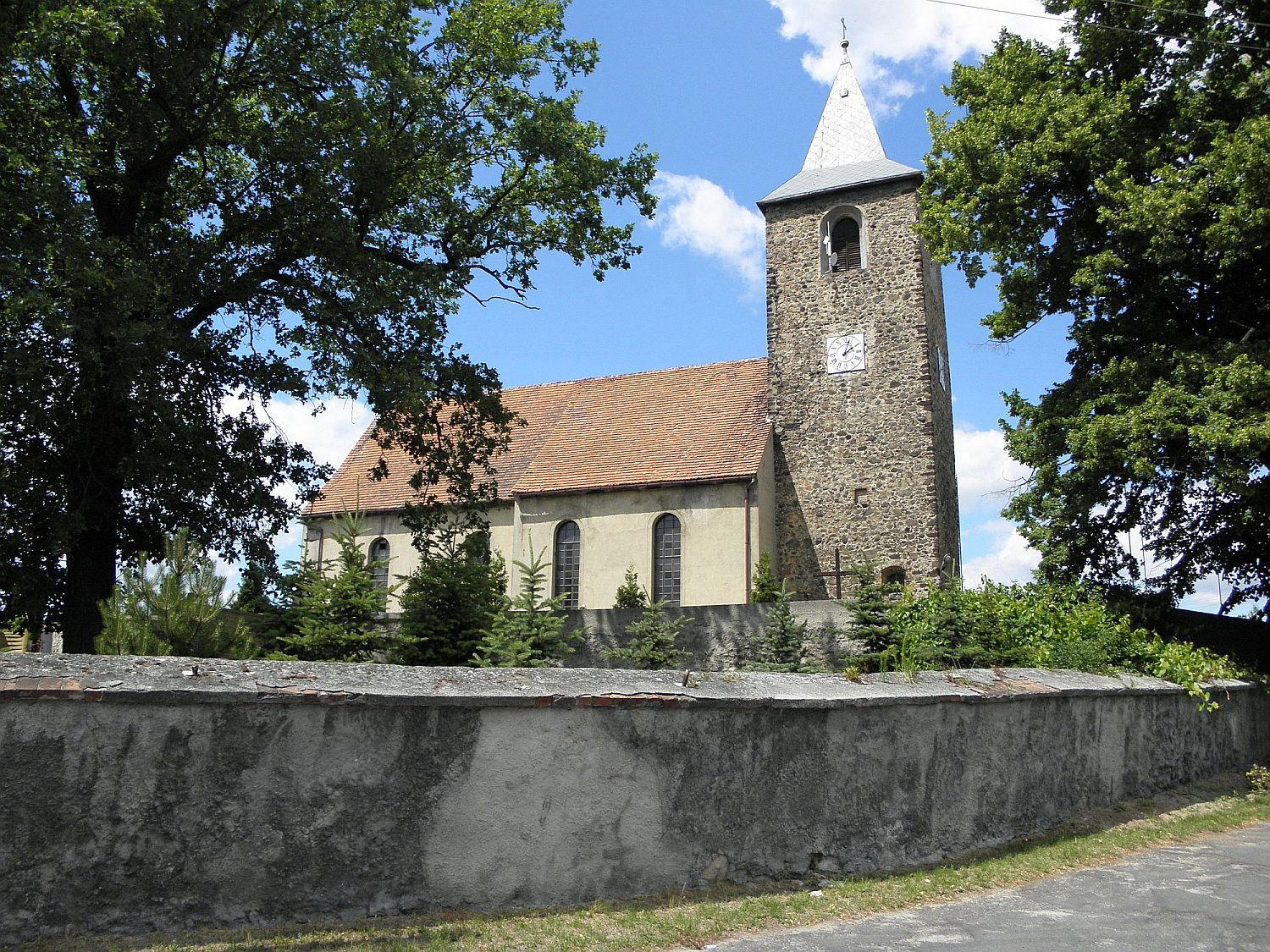
- Church

- Location within Poland
- Coordinates: 51°38′41″N 15°0′35″E
- Country: Poland
- Voivodeship: Lubusz
- County: Żary
- Gmina: Lipinki Łużyckie
- Population: 1,800

Lipinki Łużyckie (Polish pronunciation: [liˈpiŋkʲi wuˈʐɨtskʲɛ]) (German: Linderode; Lower Sorbian: Linderod) is a village in Żary County, Lubusz Voivodeship, in western Poland. It is the seat of Gmina Lipinki Łużyckie.

The village is served by Lipinki Łużyckie railway station.
