= Dębinka, Lubusz Voivodeship =

Dębinka
- Village
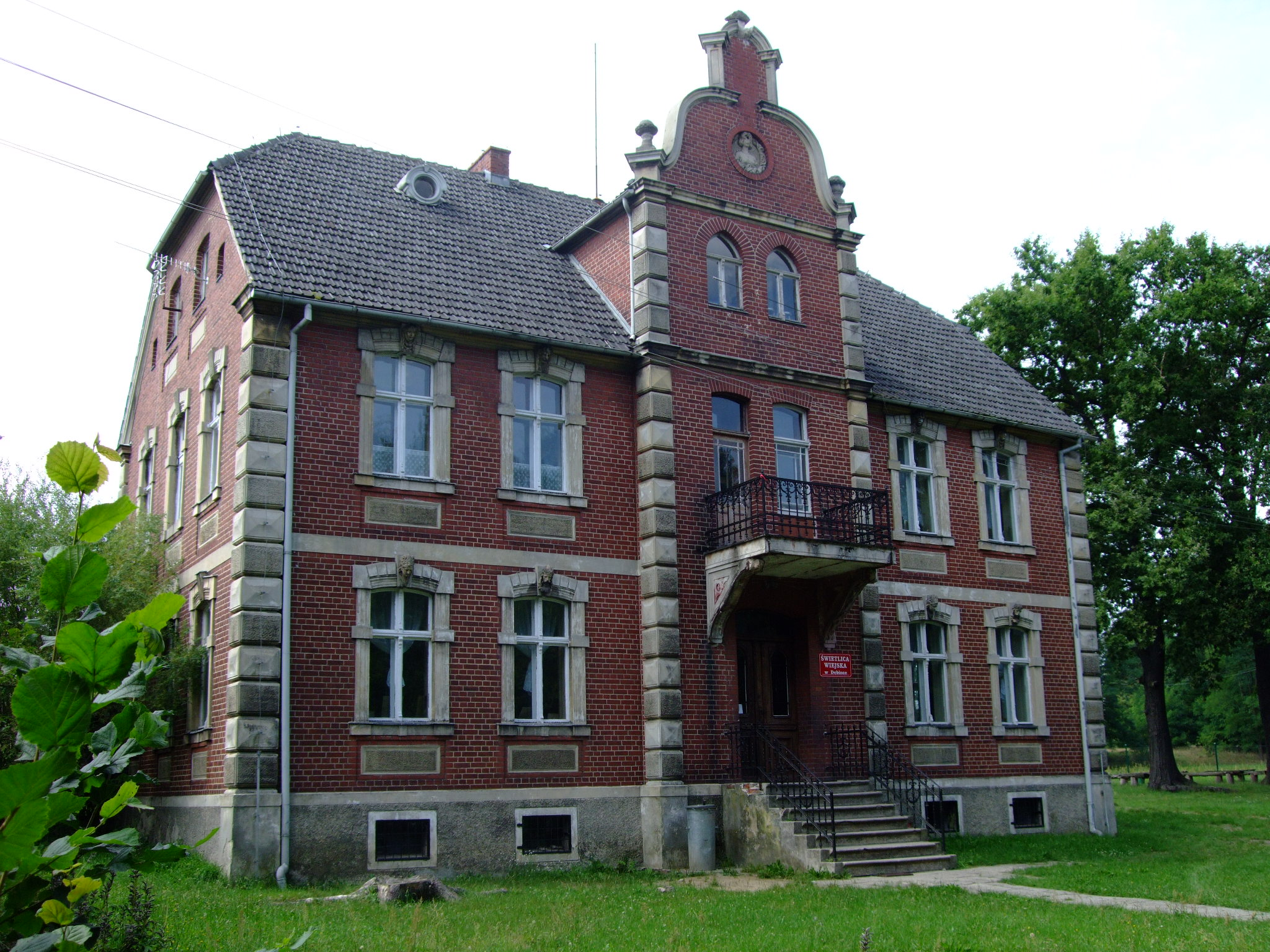

- Location within Poland
- Coordinates: 51°39′39″N 14°54′54″E
- Country: Poland
- Voivodeship: Lubusz
- County: Żary
- Gmina: Trzebiel

Dębinka [dɛmˈbinka] (German: Tzschecheln, 1937–1945 Eichenrode; Upper Sorbian: Čelno) is a village in the administrative district of Gmina Trzebiel, within Żary County, Lubusz Voivodeship, in western Poland, close to the German border.

It is served by Tuplice Dębinka railway station.

== Notable residents ==
- August Wilhelm Knobel (1807–1863), German Protestant theologian
- Horst Stechbarth (1925–2016), East German General
