= August Wilhelm Knobel =

German theologian

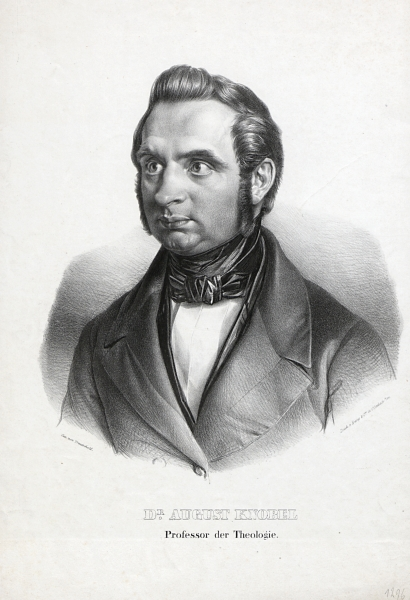
August Knobel, Lithography, c. 1850

August Wilhelm Karl Knobel (7 February 1807 – 25 May 1863) was a German Protestant theologian.

He was born in Tzschecheln near Sorau, Niederlausitz. He was the son of a farmer and estate manager.

From 1826 he studied philosophy, philology and theology at the University of Breslau, earning his doctorate in 1831. Afterwards, he became a lecturer, and later an associate professor (1835) at Breslau. In 1838 he became a professor of theology at Breslau, and shortly afterwards relocated to the University of Giessen.

Knobel specialized in Old Testament exegesis, and was the author of numerous interpretations and commentaries on the Pentateuch and other books of the Old Testament. Among his better-known publications are the following:

- Commentar über das Buch Kohelet, (Commentary on the Book of Ecclesiastes); (1836)
- Der Prophetismus der Hebräer, (Prophetism of the Hebrews); (1837)
- Der Prophet Jesaia, (The Prophet Isaiah); (1843)
- Exegetisches vademecum fur Herrn Professor Ewald in Tübingen, (Exegetical Handbook for Prof. Ewald at Tübingen); (1844)- This publication was a polemic in reaction to Georg Heinrich August Ewald's disparaging critique of Knobel's Der Prophet Jesaia.
- Die Völkertafel der Genesis, (The Table of Nations from the Book of Genesis); (1850)
- Die Bücher Exodus und Leviticus (The Books of Exodus and Leviticus); (1857)
- Die Bücher Numeri, Deuteronomium, und Josua (The Books of Numbers, Deuteronomy and Joshua); (1861)

The commentaries on Isaiah and the books of the Pentateuch were edited by August Dillmann.
