= Chełmica =

- Village
- Location within Poland
- Coordinates: 51°39′N 14°50′E
- Country: Poland
- Voivodeship: Lubusz
- County: Żary
- Gmina: Tuplice

Chełmica [xɛu̯ˈmit͡sa] (German: Helmsdorf) is a village in the administrative district of Gmina Tuplice, within Żary County, Lubusz Voivodeship, in western Poland.
