= Zasieki railway station =

Railway station in Zasieki, western Poland

Zasieki
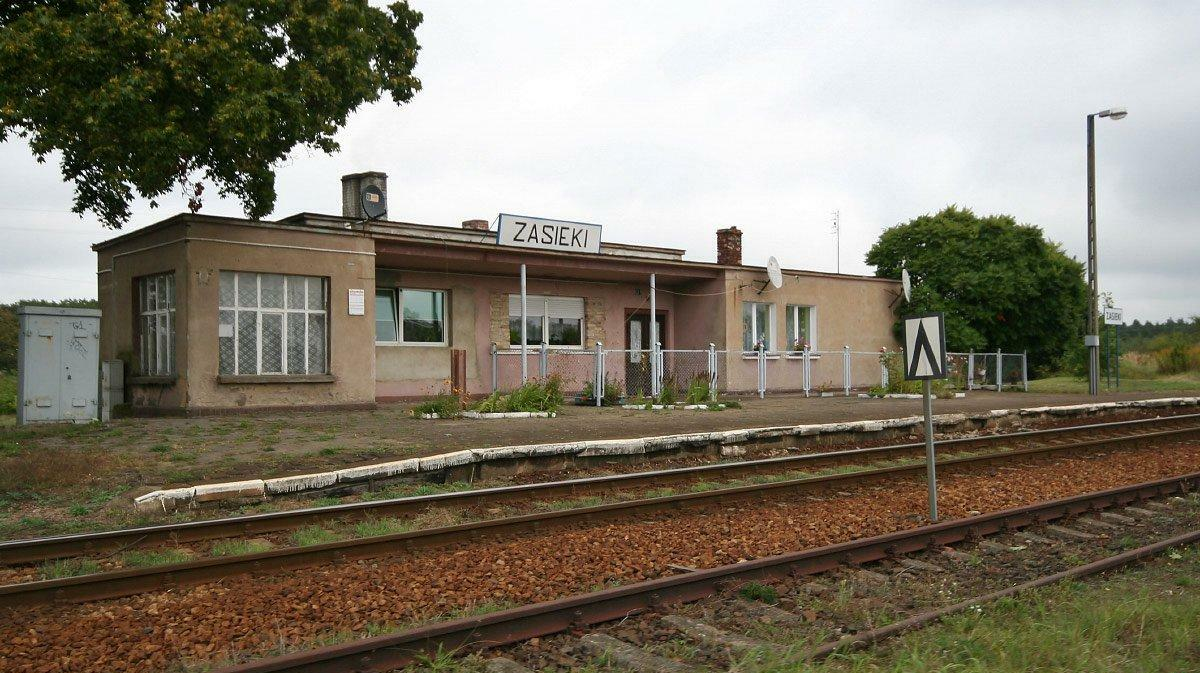
- Station building in September 2009

General information
- Location: Zasieki, Lubusz Voivodeship; Poland
- Coordinates: 51°44′09.0″N 14°40′10.0″E
- Owner: PKP Polskie Linie Kolejowe
- Line: Łódź Kaliska–Zasieki
- Platforms: 2 (1 disused)

History
- Opened: 14 May 1950

Services
Preceding station	KD	Following station
Tuplice towards Wrocław Główny	D14	Forst (Lausitz) Terminus
Preceding station	Polregio	Following station
Tuplice towards Małomice	PR	Forst (Lausitz) Terminus
Location
- Location within Poland

Zasieki is a railway station in the village of Zasieki, Żary County within the Lubusz Voivodeship in western Poland.

Zasieki is the final station in Poland of the Łódź Kaliska–Zasieki railway before it carries on to Forst (Lausitz), Germany.

== History ==
The station was opened on 14 May 1950. Prior to this, only a goods yard had functioned at the station. It closed in 1966.

== Train services ==
The station is served by the following services:

- Regional services (KD) Wrocław - Legnica - Żary - Forst (Lausitz)
- Regional services (PR) Małomice - Forst (Lausitz)

== See also ==
- Forst (Lausitz) station
