= Gmina Tuplice =

Gmina Tuplice Tuplice Commune
- Gmina
- Coat of arms
- Interactive map of Gmina Tuplice
- Coordinates (Tuplice): 51°41′N 14°50′E
- Country: Poland
- Voivodeship: Lubusz
- County: Żary
- Seat: Tuplice

Area
  - Total: 65.89 km^{2} (25.44 sq mi)

Population (2019-06-30)
  - Total: 3,066
  - Density: 46.53/km^{2} (120.5/sq mi)
- Website: http://www.tuplice.pl

Gmina Tuplice is a rural gmina (administrative district) in Żary County, Lubusz Voivodeship, in western Poland. Its seat is the village of Tuplice, which lies approximately 22 kilometres (14 mi) west of Żary and 55 km (34 mi) south-west of Zielona Góra.

The gmina covers an area of 65.89 square kilometres (25.4 sq mi), and as of 2019 its total population is 3,066.

The gmina contains part of the protected area called Muskau Bend Landscape Park.

== Villages ==
Gmina Tuplice contains the villages and settlements of Chełmica, Chlebice, Cielmów, Czerna, Drzeniów, Grabów, Grabówek, Gręzawa, Jagłowice, Łazy, Matuszowice, Nowa Rola, Świbinki and Tuplice.

== Neighbouring gminas ==
Gmina Tuplice is bordered by the gminas of Brody, Jasień, Lipinki Łużyckie, Lubsko and Trzebiel.

== Twin towns – sister cities ==
Gmina Tuplice is twinned with:

- Döbern, Germany
