= Grabów, Żary County =

Grabów
- Village
- Location within Poland
- Coordinates: 51°42′N 14°55′E
- Country: Poland
- Voivodeship: Lubusz
- County: Żary
- Gmina: Tuplice
- Postal code: 68-300
- Vehicle registration: FZA

Grabów [ˈɡrabuf] (Upper Sorbian: Grabow) is a village in the administrative district of Gmina Tuplice, within Żary County, Lubusz Voivodeship, in western Poland.
