= Cielmów =

- Village
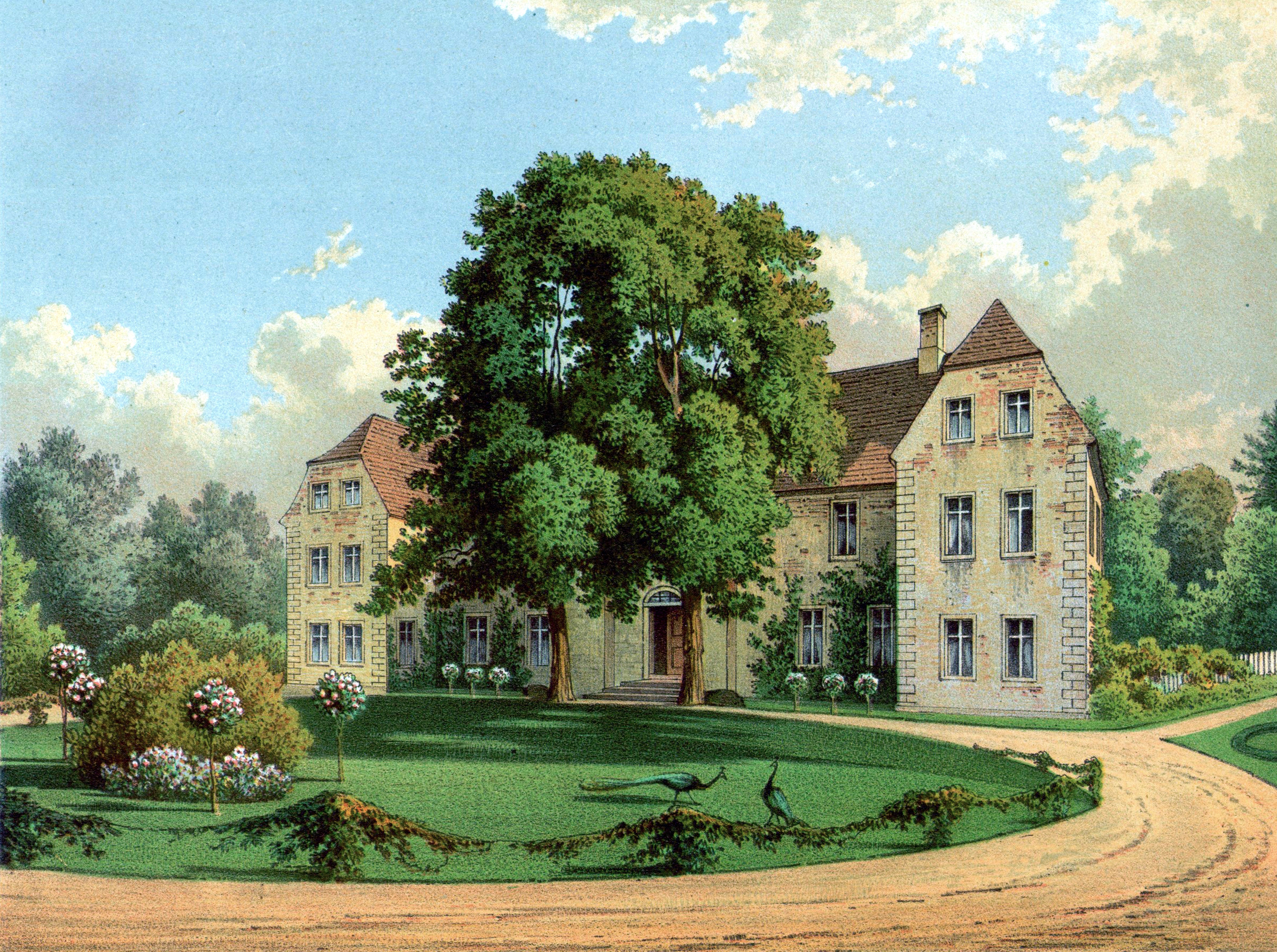

- Location within Poland
- Coordinates: 51°40′N 14°51′E
- Country: Poland
- Voivodeship: Lubusz
- County: Żary
- Gmina: Tuplice
- Population: 346

Cielmów [ˈt͡ɕɛlmuf] is a village in the administrative district of Gmina Tuplice, within Żary County, Lubusz Voivodeship, in western Poland.
