= Drzeniów, Żary County =

Drzeniów
- Village
- Location within Poland
- Coordinates: 51°43′11″N 14°54′21″E
- Country: Poland
- Voivodeship: Lubusz
- County: Żary
- Gmina: Tuplice

Drzeniów [ˈdʐɛɲuf] (German: Drehne; Upper Sorbian: Třepotać; Lower Sorbian: Tśěkotaś se tśěkotaś) is a village in the administrative district of Gmina Tuplice, within Żary County, Lubusz Voivodeship, in western Poland.
