= Matuszowice =

- Village
- Location within Poland
- Coordinates: 51°41′N 14°56′E
- Country: Poland
- Voivodeship: Lubusz
- County: Żary
- Gmina: Tuplice

Matuszowice [matuʂɔˈvit͡sɛ] is a village in the administrative district of Gmina Tuplice, within Żary County, Lubusz Voivodeship, in western Poland.
