= Grabówek, Lubusz Voivodeship =

Grabówek
- Village
- Location within Poland
- Coordinates: 51°42′32″N 14°52′23″E
- Country: Poland
- Voivodeship: Lubusz
- County: Żary
- Gmina: Tuplice

Grabówek [ɡraˈbuvɛk] is a village in the administrative district of Gmina Tuplice, within Żary County, Lubusz Voivodeship, in western Poland.
