= Chlebice =

- Village
- Location within Poland
- Coordinates: 51°41′10.2″N 14°53′55.9″E
- Country: Poland
- Voivodeship: Lubusz
- County: Żary
- Gmina: Tuplice

Chlebice [xlɛˈbit͡sɛ] (German: Wiesenthal) is a village in the administrative district of Gmina Tuplice, within Żary County, Lubusz Voivodeship, in western Poland.
