= Friedrich Engels Military Academy =

Coordinates: 51.0316°N 13.7546°E

- Militärakademie „Friedrich Engels“
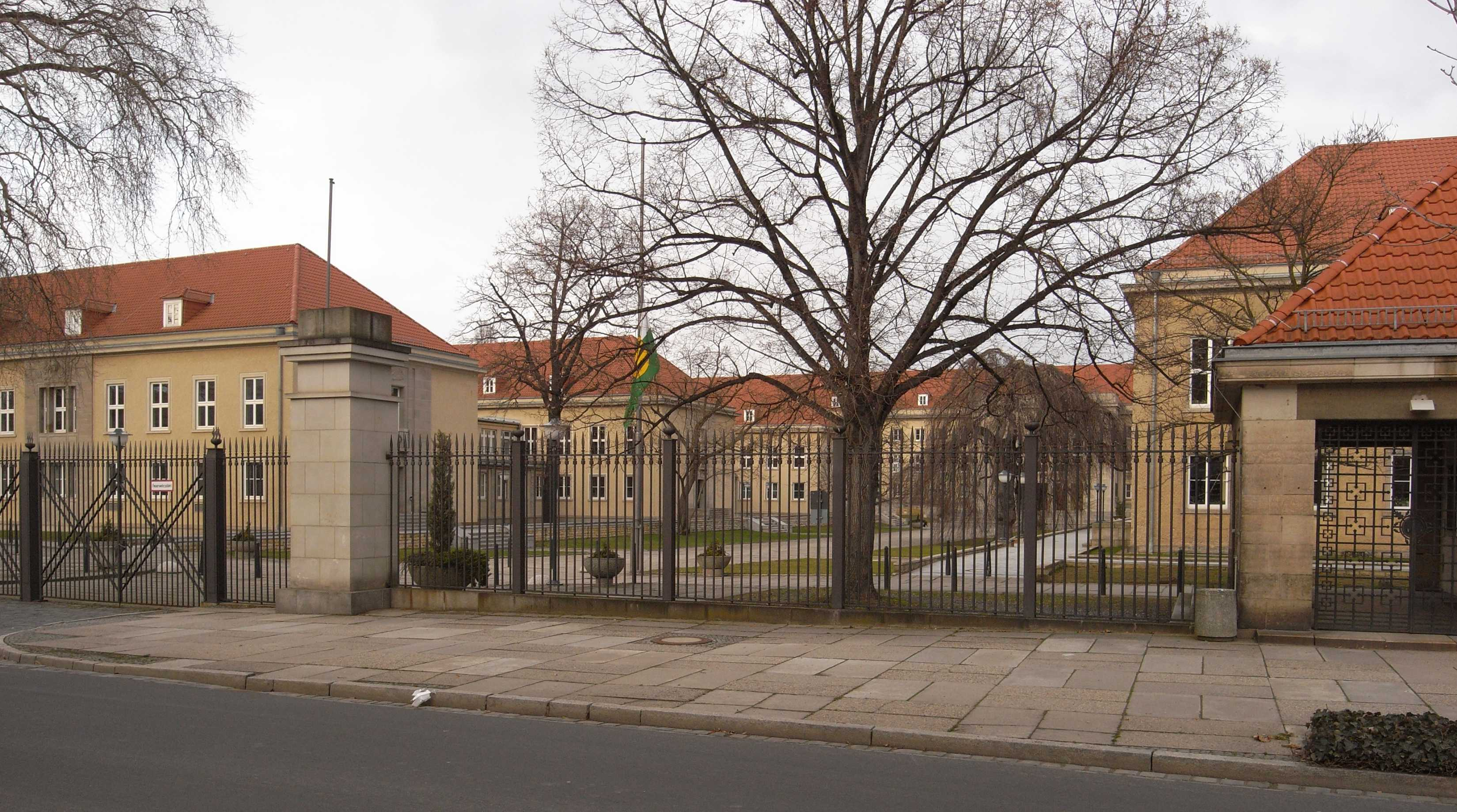
- The former campus in 2008
- Active: January 5, 1959–December 31, 1990
- Affiliation: Ministry of National Defense
- Chairman: Commander/Chief of the Academy
- Students: Graduates: 6290 officers including 181 from foreign nations
- Location: Dresden, East Germany

The Friedrich Engels Military Academy (German: Militärakademie „Friedrich Engels“) was the first military institution founded in East Germany and the highest leveled military teaching and research institution. Located in Dresden, the academy was the center of military science of East Germany.

The academy was formed on January 5, 1959, to provide training and military-related studies to officers of all branches of the newly formed National People's Army (NVA), Border Troops of the German Democratic Republic, and other security organs as well as armed forces from other nations. The academy's training was comparable to military academies in the Soviet Union. In addition to training and research for the implementation of the defense policy of East Germany, the Friedrich Engels Military Academy also focused on the maintenance of the military-scientific heritage and the development to the center of military-scientific work.

== History ==
=== Before foundation ===
Foundations for what would become the Friedrich Engels Military Academy were set in February 1949 by the University of the German Administration of the Interior, which was relocated from Berlin to the village of Kochstedt in Saxony-Anhalt.

On November 15, 1949, the teaching company opened and was renamed to the Kochstedt Officers' School of Central Administration Training of the Ministry of the Interior, under the leadership of Chief Inspector of the Barracked People's Police Walter Freytag.

From September 1952, the academy was renamed the Higher Officer School of the Ministry of the Interior. The location also moved from Kochstedt to Dresden and continued to be led by Lieutenant General Walter Freytag.

Soon after in 1953 it was renamed to the College of the Barracked People's Police (KVP). Colonel Wilhelm Adam, former adjutant to the commander-in-chief of the 6th Army of the Wehrmacht, post-1945 Minister of Finance of the State of Saxony, and member of the Volkskammer, took over the post of commander of the university.

The former Generalfeldmarschall Friedrich Paulus used to give lectures at the university after his return from captivity, and by 1954, he led a small working group called the War History Research Center in Dresden. His small working group eventually became the foundations for the Institute for German Military History, which was later renamed the Military History Institute of the German Democratic Republic in 1972.

When the National People's Army (NVA) was formed by the Volkskammer on January 18, 1956, which effectively replaced the Barracked People's Police, allowed for the College for Officers of the NVA in Dresden to emerge as the highest military teaching facility in East Germany. Colonel Wilhelm Adam became the first commander; followed by Major General Heinrich Dollwetzel from April 1, 1958. This also effectively allowed the NVA to take over the politically reliable and technically competent officers of the Barracked People's Police.

The university was commissioned to raise the scientific level of training in all subject areas in order to create the conditions for a military academy. When it was founded, the chairs of social science training, infantry training, artillery training and tank training were created. In addition to the two-year courses, in which officers who were already experienced in the troop service were trained as regimental commanders, their deputies and chiefs of staff for motor gunner, tank and artillery units, heads of special troops and services, the university carried out one-year qualification courses for senior officers.

After the West German Bundeswehr joined NATO in 1955, the National People's Army joined the rivaling Warsaw Pact on May 24, 1958. A formal military academy had to be established to train the National People's Army up to Warsaw Pact standards and requirements.

Ministerial order 52/58 began in May 1958, which called for the conversion of the college for officers into a military academy. According to the decision of the Council of Ministers of November 28, 1958, it was to become the first military institution to be granted the right to confer the academic degree of "diploma military scientist" and "diploma engineer" and to set up scientific aspirations.

=== Foundation ===
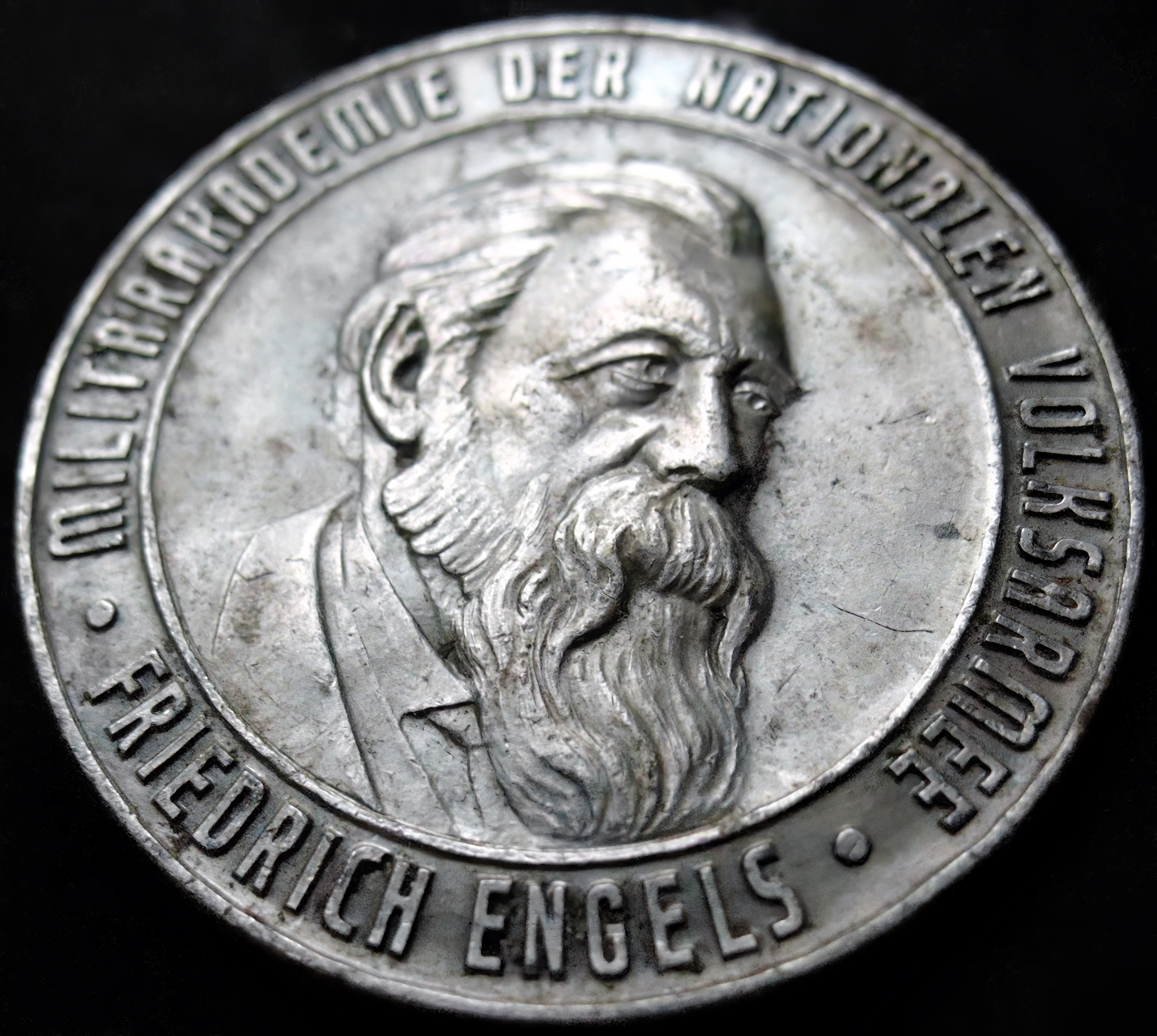
Medal of the Friedrich Engels Military Academy

The founding of the new military academy was not an instant decision, but more of a reaction to the arms race during the Cold War and the establishment of the Bundeswehr Command and Staff College. The military academy's leadership had a particularly close relationship with the Socialist Unity Party leadership, whose political leadership claim was secured by Article 1 of the Constitution of East Germany. This can be evidenced by the awarding of the honorary name "Friedrich Engels" to the academy. The Friedrich Engels Military Academy was officially founded on January 5, 1959.

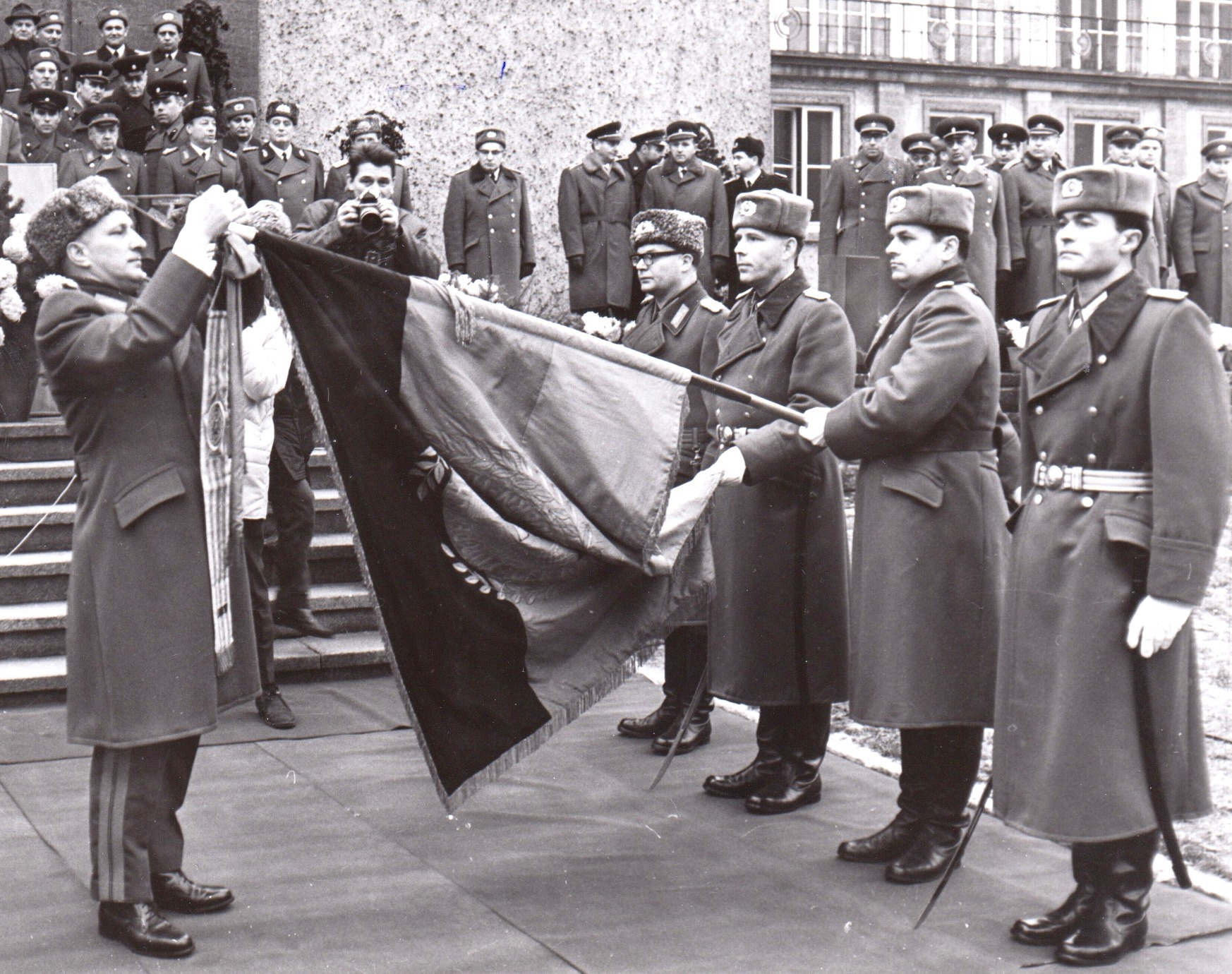
Flag loop for "Battle Order in Gold", awarded by Heinz Kessler on January 10, 1969.

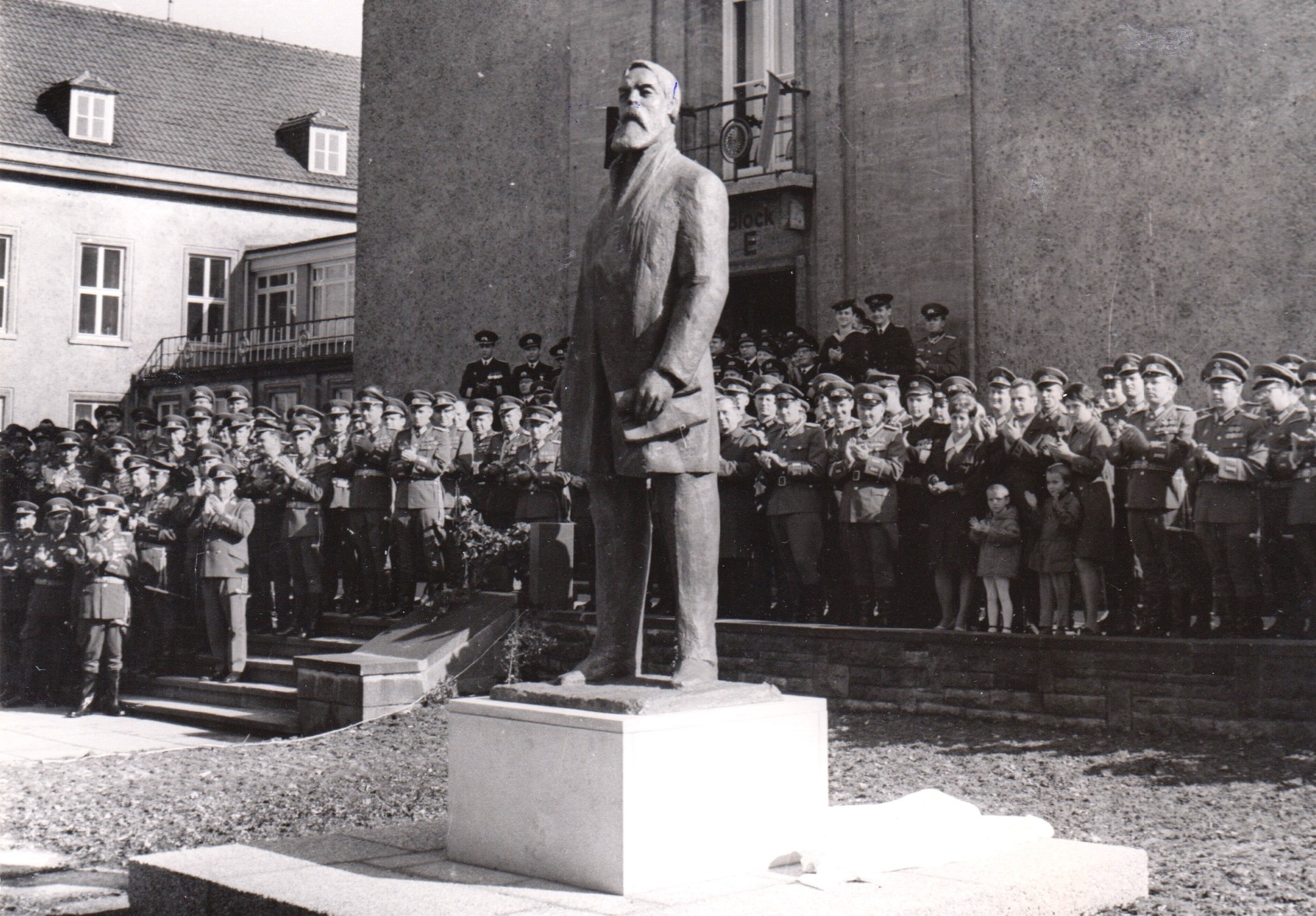
Friedrich Engels statue in the courtyard of the front entrance of the Military Academy, commemorating 20 years of the German Democratic Republic on October 10, 1969

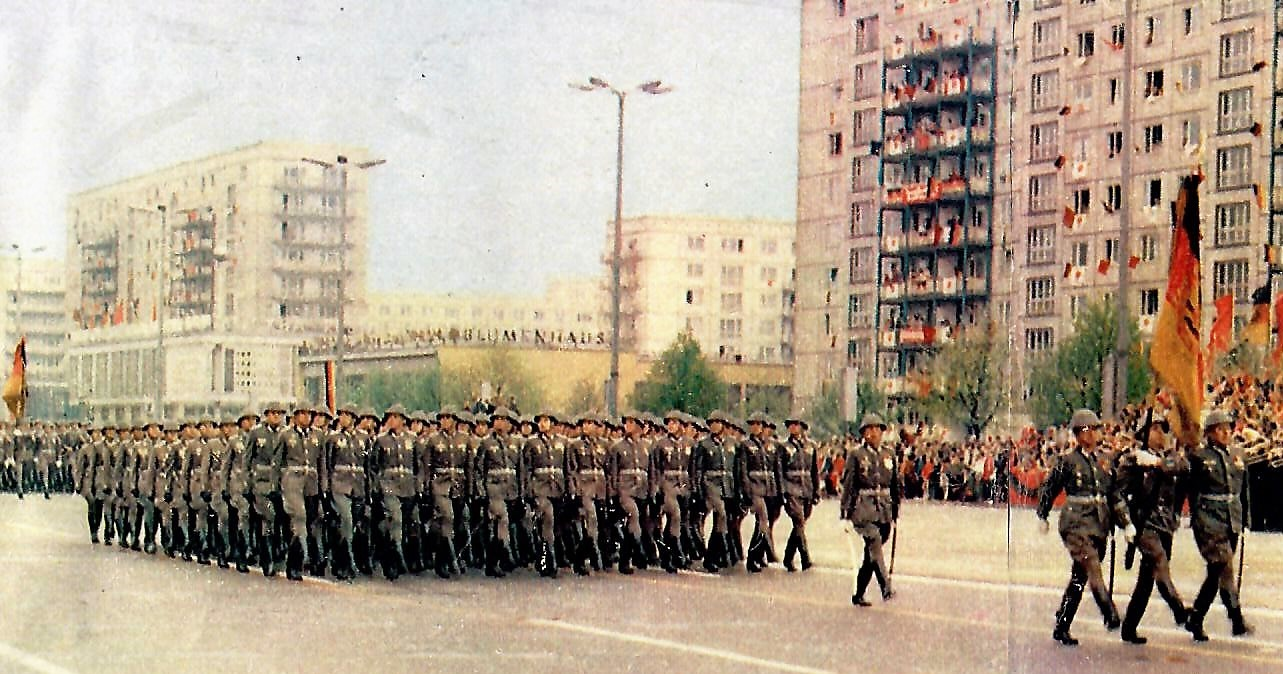
The cadets of the academy during the Tag der Republik parade in 1974.

A permanent political-ideological education and social science qualification arose from East Germany's political environment. A clear commitment to the Socialist Unity Party's policy was expected from the teaching staff and the officer hearers. It was not until the mid-1980s that their influence eroded and finally led to the dissolution of the Socialist Unity Party party organizations in the National People's Army and the Border Troops of the German Democratic Republic, including the Friedrich Engels Military Academy in December 1989.

=== Status ===
The military academy had the legal status of a university in East Germany and thus had the right to award graduates and aspirants with academic degrees, such as Graduate Military Scientist, Graduate Engineer, Graduate Social Scientist, Graduate Teacher, and so forth.

The military academy belonged to the second sector of the East German university system, to the so-called universities with special status. However, due to its integration with the National People's Army, there were a few significant differences from civilian universities.

- The responsibilities of the Ministry of Higher and Technical Education were essentially transferred to the Ministry of National Defense, who, in consultation with the Ministry of Higher and Technical Education, issued regulations for the enforcement of statutory university regulations.
- Unlike other universities in East Germany, the rector, the protectors (deputy of the boss), the section directors, and the deans could not be elected. The military academy executives were generals and officers and were assigned to their positions by order/rank.
- The students (officer hearers, around 30 years of age) and course participants were officers and generals who had already completed a technical or university degree and had gained professional experience.
- Military teaching and research subjects were largely subject to military secrecy.
- Although the Friedrich Engels Military Academy was based on the image of Soviet military academies, the merging of all branches of the armed forces, the military-technical and the social-scientific disciplines under one academic roof was a novelty among Warsaw Pact states.
- Until 1990, a Soviet general with the service title Military Specialist was a representative of the Warsaw Pact United Armed Forces at the academy

The term special status also extends to the fact that the military academy, together with the others universities of the National People's Army, Border Troops of the German Democratic Republic, the other protection and security organs as well as the social organizations in the state official representations (statistics, yearbooks, UNESCO reports) about the university landscape were left out.

=== Leadership Structure ===
Head

The military academy was subordinate to the Minister of National Defense of East Germany, who entrusted the duty supervision to one of his deputies. The academy was headed by a commander from 1959 to 1970 and then a chief from 1970 to 1990.

No.	Picture	Name (Birth–Death)	Took office	Left office	Rank
List of Commanders/Chiefs of the Friedrich Engels Military Academy					
1		Heinrich Dollwetzel (1912–1966)	1 October 1958	30 September 1959	Major general
2		Fritz Johne (1911–1989)	1 October 1959	31 May 1963	Major general
3		Heinrich Heitsch (1916–1986)	1 June 1963	30 April 1964	Major general
4		Hans Weisner (1925–2013)	1 May 1964	10 December 1986	Lieutenant General
5		Manfred Gehmert (1931–2020)	11 December 1986	28 February 1990	Lieutenant General
6		Hans Süß (1935–2009)	1 March 1990	30 September 1990	Lieutenant General
7		Gerhard Kolitsch (?–?)	1 October 1990	31 December 1990	Colonel

=== University Structure ===
The Friedrich Engels Military Academy was unique among Warsaw Pact nations due to its internal structure. All branches of the National People's Army and their sub-branches were under one academic roof. The sections and chairs of the military and military-technical scientific areas were primarily structured according to armed forces, branches of service and military services.

The university structure was subject to multiple changes. In 1990, there were 73 professors or chairs at the military academy. The number of chairs fluctuated depending on the number of students. At its lowest point, there were 44 chairs.

The academy was divided into faculties (called sections after 1970), which in turn were divided were divided into chairs. Their leaders were under the command of the military academy; they were the direct superiors of the officers' hearers themselves. Initially, only the officer's office of the disciplines (or uses, later: profiles) were assigned to four faculties:

- General leadership
- Artillery
- Tank engineer service
- Back services

From 1960, the chairs and officer listeners were classified into the following faculties:

- Land Forces Faculty
- Tank Engineer Service Faculty
- Air Forces/ Air Defense Faculty
- Social Sciences Faculty
- Naval Forces Faculty

The Social Sciences Faculty was entrusted with the academic training of all political officers in the armed forces in accordance with the three-year program of the Parteihochschule Karl Marx and the Marxist–Leninist basic courses for the officers.
