= Hakhshara =

Centers for Zionist youth

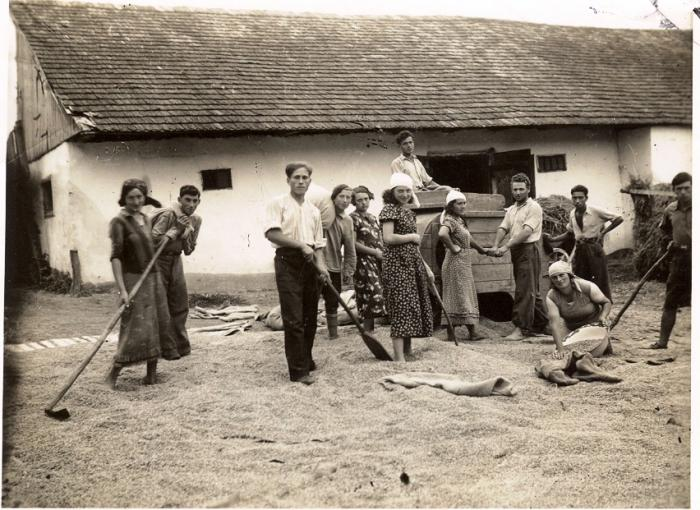
Betar members engaged in sifting wheat at the Ze'ev Jabotinsky training farm (hakhshara) in Zastavna, Romania, 1946.

Hakhshara (Hebrew: הַכְשָׁרָה; also transliterated Hachsharah, Hachshara or Hakhsharah) is a Hebrew word that literally means "preparation". The term is used for training programs and agricultural centres in Europe and elsewhere. At these centers Zionist youth and young adults would learn vocational skills necessary for their emigration to Israel and subsequent life in kibbutzim. Such camps existed before World War II, and still exist today.

== Post-war era ==
Following the end of World War II, a new wave of Hakhshara centers was established to serve Jewish Holocaust survivors, often referred to as Sh'erit ha-Pletah (the surviving remnant). These programs were primarily located in and around Displaced Persons (DP) camps in Allied-occupied Germany, Austria, and Italy.

The primary goal of these post-war Hakhsharot was to provide agricultural and vocational training to prepare survivors intending on Aliyah (immigration to Mandatory Palestine) and life in a kibbutz. The first such group established in Germany after the war was Kibbutz Buchenwald, an agricultural collective formed by survivors of the Buchenwald concentration camp. Another was Kibbutz Nili, a training farm established on the former estate of Julius Streicher.

Italy served as a major transit hub for survivors journeying toward Mandatory Palestine, and approximately 45 Hakhsharot and kibbutzim operated within or alongside the Italian DP camps.

These programs were often supported by international relief organizations. For example, by 1947, the American Jewish Joint Distribution Committee (JDC) maintained 49 Hakhshara camps in Hungary alone, providing agricultural training for nearly 6,000 Jewish youths preparing for emigration.

== Modern era ==
Nowadays, these programs are usually based on kibbutzim in Israel for youth who are in their gap year, between finishing high-school and starting university, and include exploring Israel and studying Israeli culture. This was also true of the religious programs, that until a few decades were based on a religious kibbutz and typically contained a period of Torah study. Nowadays, the religious programs still incorporate a period on a religious kibbutz, but are more diverse in what they offer, see at Bnei Akiva website (here).

== List of Hakhshara centres ==
=== Pre-war Germany ===
- Schniebinchen in Germany (now Świbinki, Poland).
- Landwerk Neuendorf at Steinhöfel, Germany
- Altona-Blankenese at Hamburg, Germany
- Fraustadt in Posen-West Prussia, Germany, now Wschowa, Poland
- Markenhof in Germany
- Marx family at Gruessen (now Gemunden, Wohra), Germany

=== Italy ===
- Sciesopoli in Italy.

=== Netherlands ===
- Werkdorp Nieuwesluis in the Netherlands
- Westerbork (village)

=== Pre-war Poland ===
- over 200 hakhsharas
- Iwanie Puste and nearby village of Tzygany, now in Ternopil Oblast, Ukraine

=== Pre-war Lithuania ===
- Ponevezh (Yiddish) or Panevėžys, Lithuania

=== Post-war Australia ===
- Springvale, Victoria and later Toolamba, Australia

== See also ==
- HeHalutz, organization
- Youth aliyah
- Youth village
