= Republic Day (East Germany) =

Official holiday in East Germany

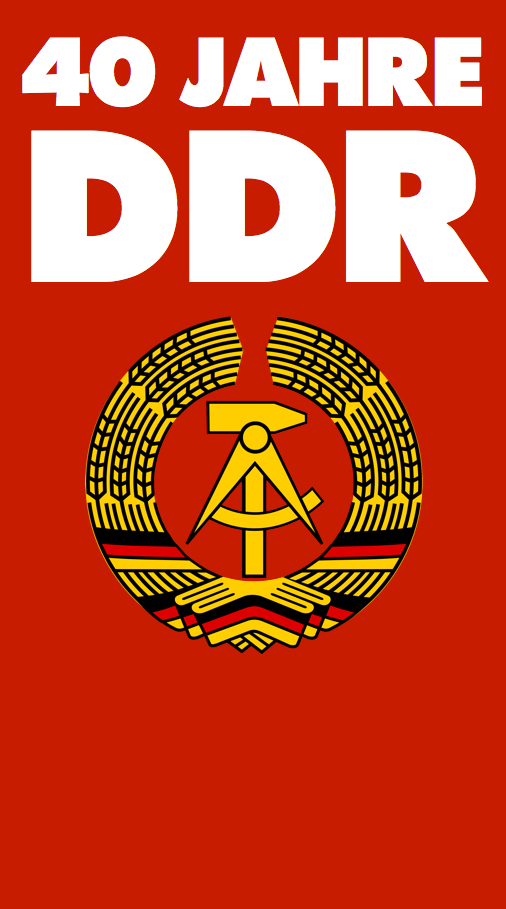
- A banner in honor of the 40th anniversary of the GDR in 1989.
- Observed by: GDR
- Type: State
- Significance: Commemorating the anniversary of the Foundation of East Germany
- Celebrations: Fireworks, Concerts, Parades
- Date: 7 October

Republic Day (German: Tag der Republik) was an official holiday in East Germany, celebrated annually on 7 October from 1949 to 1989. Republic Day commemorates the anniversary of the establishment of the German Democratic Republic on 7 October 1949. On Republic Day, the Government of the GDR awarded many people the National Award of the GDR.

== Background ==
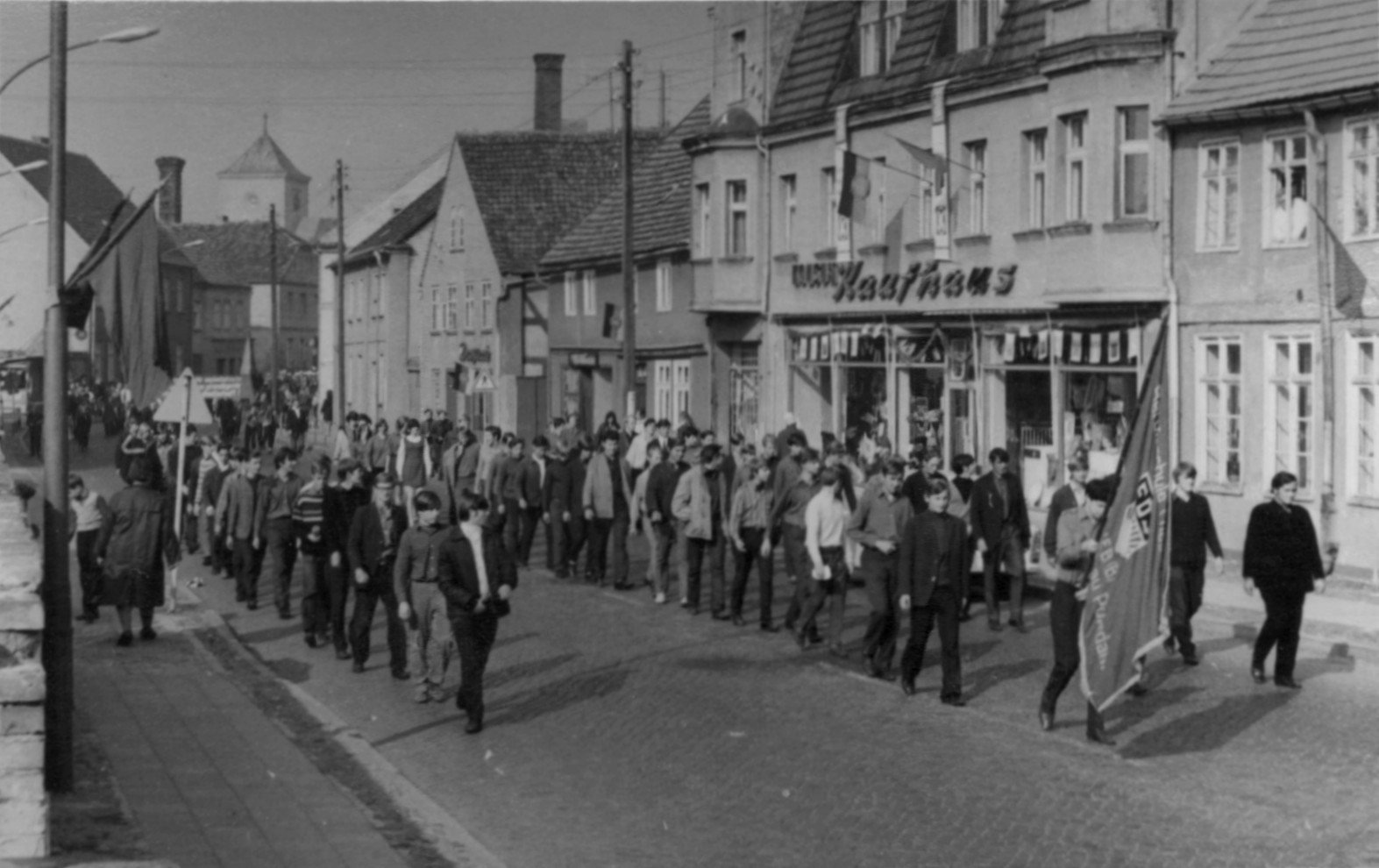
The celebrations in 1969

The day commemorates 7 October 1949, when the German Democratic Republic was constituted on the territory of the Soviet Occupation Zone, almost half a year after the founding of the Federal Republic of Germany after the adoption of the Basic Law on 23 May 1949. It was immediately led by a government formed by the ruling communist party, known locally as the Socialist Unity Party of Germany (SED) (formed in April 1946). This solidified the 1945 division of Germany and the two states' different political systems. The first major celebrations took place in 1959 on the GDR's 10th anniversary. It was replaced in 1990 by German Unity Day, which is today celebrated on 3 October, four days before the GDR's Republic Day.

== Celebrations in the GDR ==
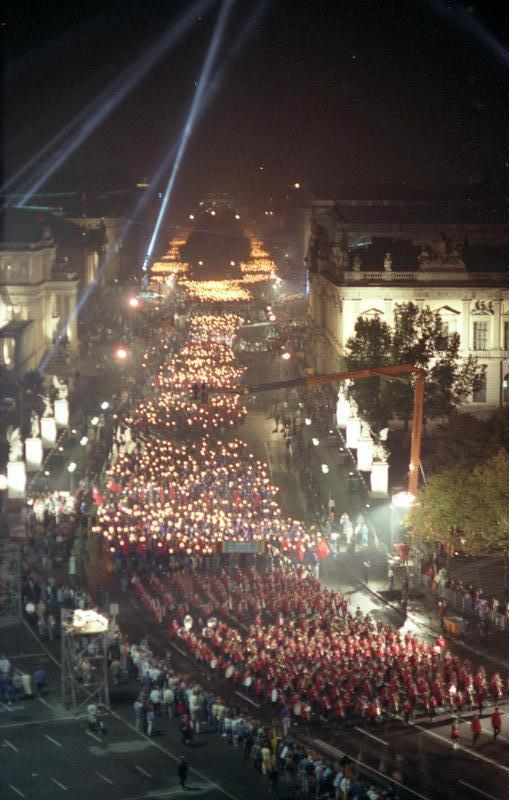
A torchlight procession in the center of Berlin on the occasion of the 40th anniversary Republic Day.

On the occasion of the Day of the Republic, special stamps were issued every five years for the State Birthday of the GDR. Since the 1970s, the day became more and more the people's holiday, without the demonstrations, but with folk festival character. In 1976, the Palace of the Republic was opened on republic day. On Republic Day in 1977, violent clashes between the People's Police and young people took place on Alexanderplatz in Berlin. They shouted slogans like "Down with the GDR!" Or "Give Peace a Chance" and many of whom were arrested and sentenced.

=== Military parade ===
The East German government has always held a Republic Day parade on Karl-Marx-Allee (between Alexanderplatz and Strausberger Platz) since its 10th anniversary in 1959. The most prominent Republic Day celebrations have taken place in 1974, 1979 and 1989, at the 25th, 30th and 40th anniversaries respectively. Since this military presence was in contrast to Berlin's Four Powers status, the military parades led regularly to protest notes of the Western Powers. The last military parade took place in 1989. Also a fleet review of the Volksmarine took place. The parade had been always led by the parade commander who had the rank of a Colonel General and the position of Chief of the Land Forces. From 1972, when that post was created, up to 1989, that was held by Col Gen Horst Stechbarth, who was the parade commander during those years. After his arrival and the report of the superintendent of the Friedrich Engels Military Academy, he took his post nearest the Massed Bands of the Military Music Service of the National People's Army and the Corps of Drums of the Central Band of the NPA.

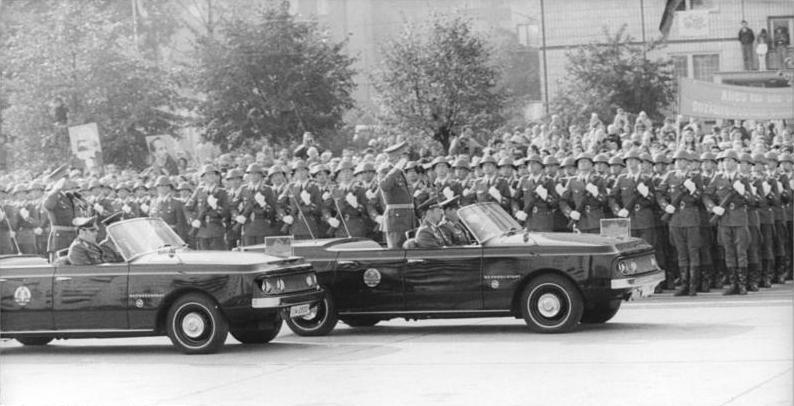
The 25th anniversary parade in 1974. This parade was held in the presence of Soviet leader Leonid Brezhnev.

At 10 am, after the arrival of state and political leaders, the bells ring and the bands sounded a fanfare, after which the parade commander had ordered the parade to present arms and eyes left as it rendered honors to the Minister of Defence, a position held by a General of the Army. As the bands were playing the Präsentiermarsch der Nationalen Volksarmee the PC and the Minister of Defense salute as their automobiles approached each other and the bands paused, with the former reporting of the readiness of the troops for the parade. The music was then resumed at the signal of the Drum Major of the Massed Bands and the Band Conductors, and the PC and the Minister first inspected the mobile column, then the bands and lastly the ground column. After the inspection, the vehicle of the parade commander returned to his first position as the Minister's vehicle stopped in order that he would depart the said vehicle and then proceed to the reviewing stand to inform the General Secretary of the SED and President of the Council of State on the readiness of the parade to march past. Following the report, the national anthem Auferstanden aus Ruinen was played, after which the parade commander ordered the parade to prepare for the march past in quick time, first to the tune of Marsch der Elisabether as the bands position for the march past, and later, following the fifes and drums, to the tune of the Parademarsch № 1 der Nationalen Volksarmee as the bands march in position in front of the grandstand.

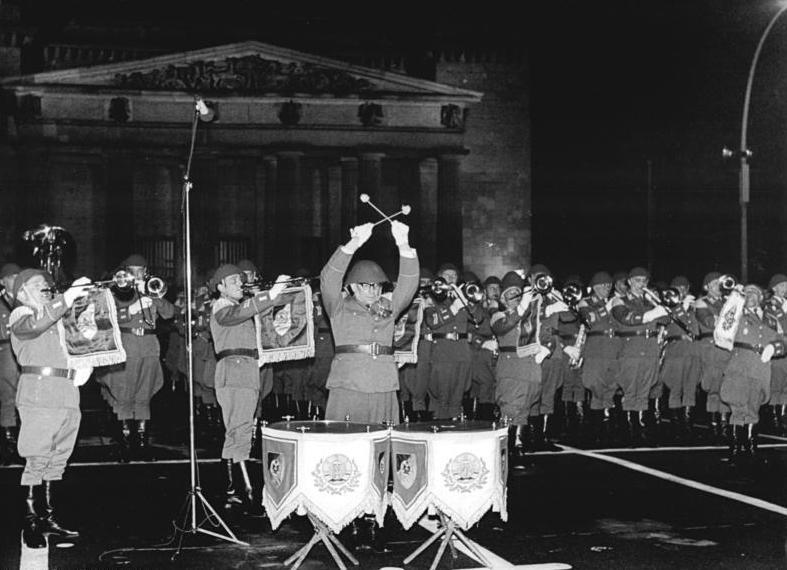
Großer Zapfenstreich on Republic Day in 1974.

=== Republic Day Grand Tattoo ===
The traditional German Großer Zapfenstreich ("Grand Tattoo") military ceremony was held on Republic Day in the evening. It was made official in 1981 after it was introduced in 1962 and was updated from the Prussian version, to adjust for the addition of "elements of the progressive military inheritance" which included Soviet compositions and a medley of German and international working-class songs and marches. It also included a torchlight procession, an opening fanfare, and the presentation of the NVA Colors.

The composition of the Grand Tattoo from 1962 to 1989 was as follows:

- Central Band of the NVA (with specialized fanfare section and 2 Timpanis)
- Corps of Drums
- Friedrich Engels Guard Regiment Ceremonial Unit
- Company of sailors of the Volksmarine
- NVA Colour guard
- Torchbearers

== Gallery ==
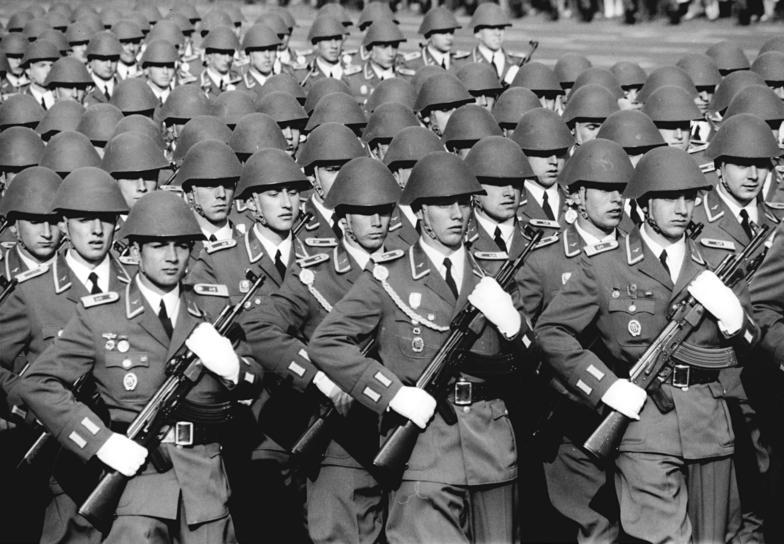

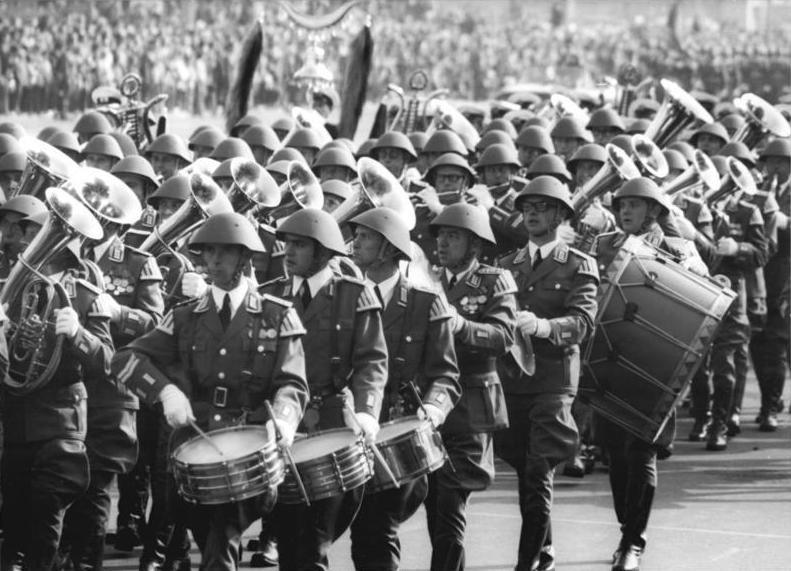

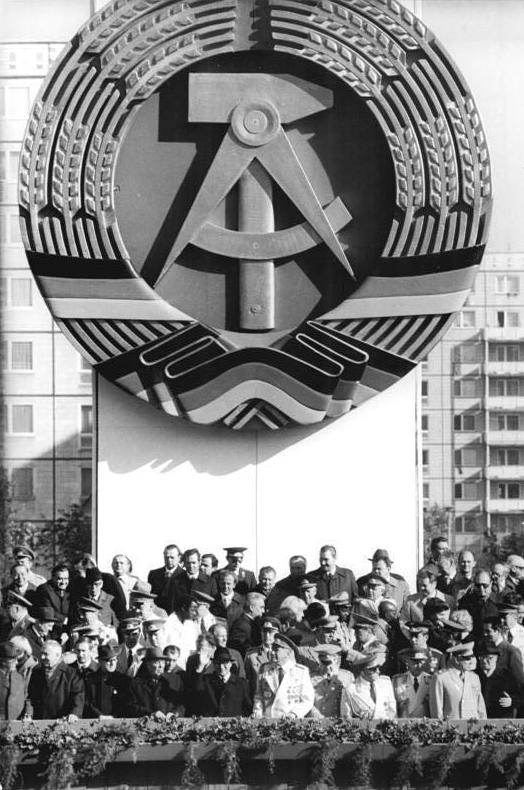

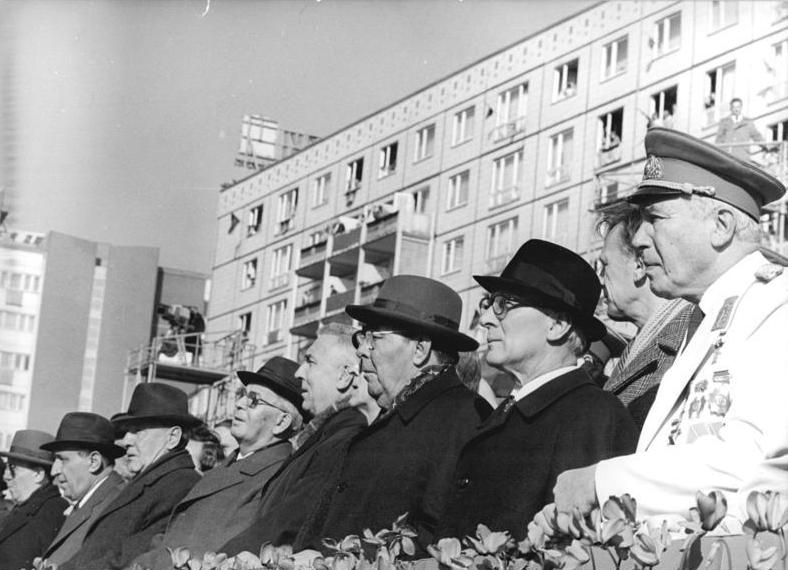

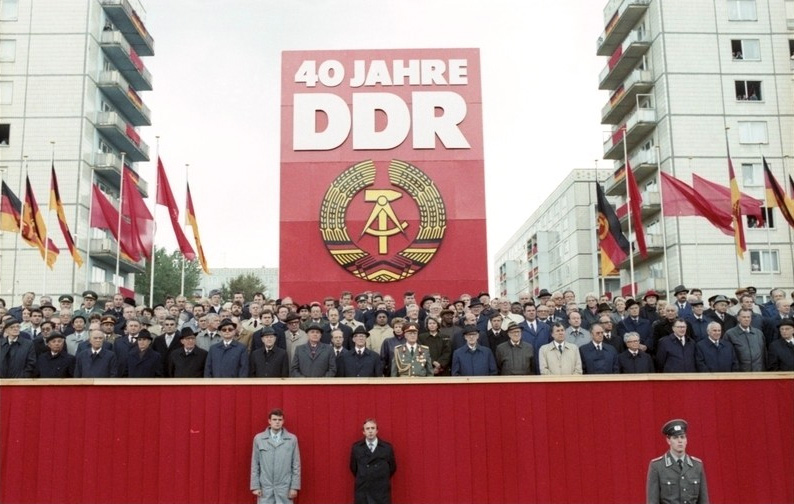

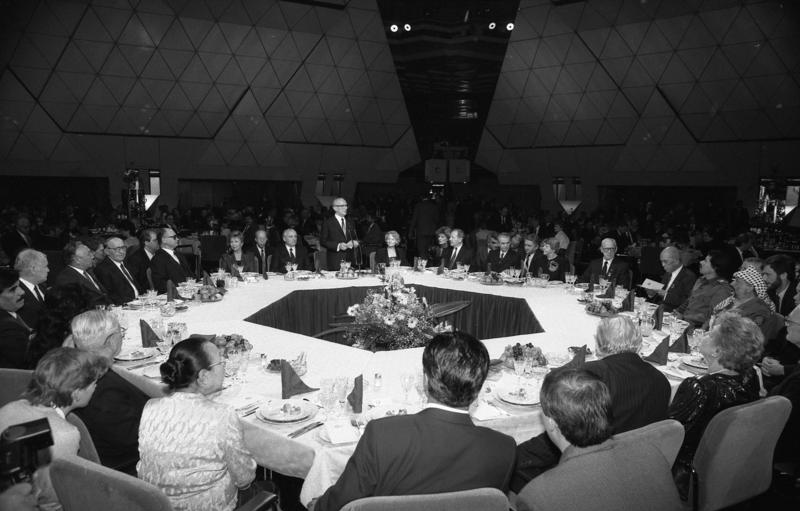

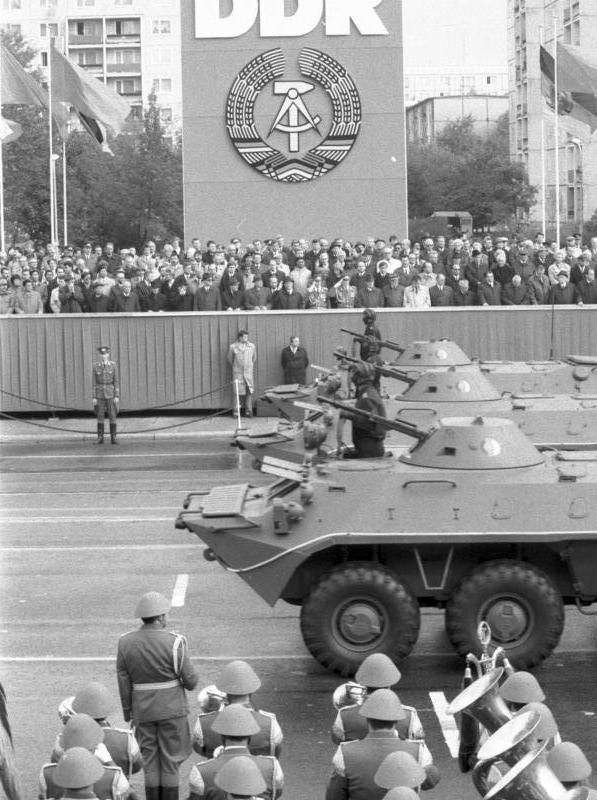

== See also ==
- Republic Day
