= Świbinki =

- Village
- Location within Poland
- Coordinates: 51°44′00″N 14°55′00″E
- Country: Poland
- Voivodeship: Lubusz
- County: Żary
- Gmina: Tuplice

Świbinki [ɕfiˈbinki] is a village in the administrative district of Gmina Tuplice, within Żary County, Lubusz Voivodeship, in western Poland.

For the history of the region, see Territorial changes of Poland after World War II.

The village was the site of a pre-war training camp for Zionist Jewish youth preparing for emigration ("aliyah") to Palestine as part of the "hakhshara" (lit. "preparation") program.
