= Łódź Kaliska–Zasieki railway =

Railway line in Poland

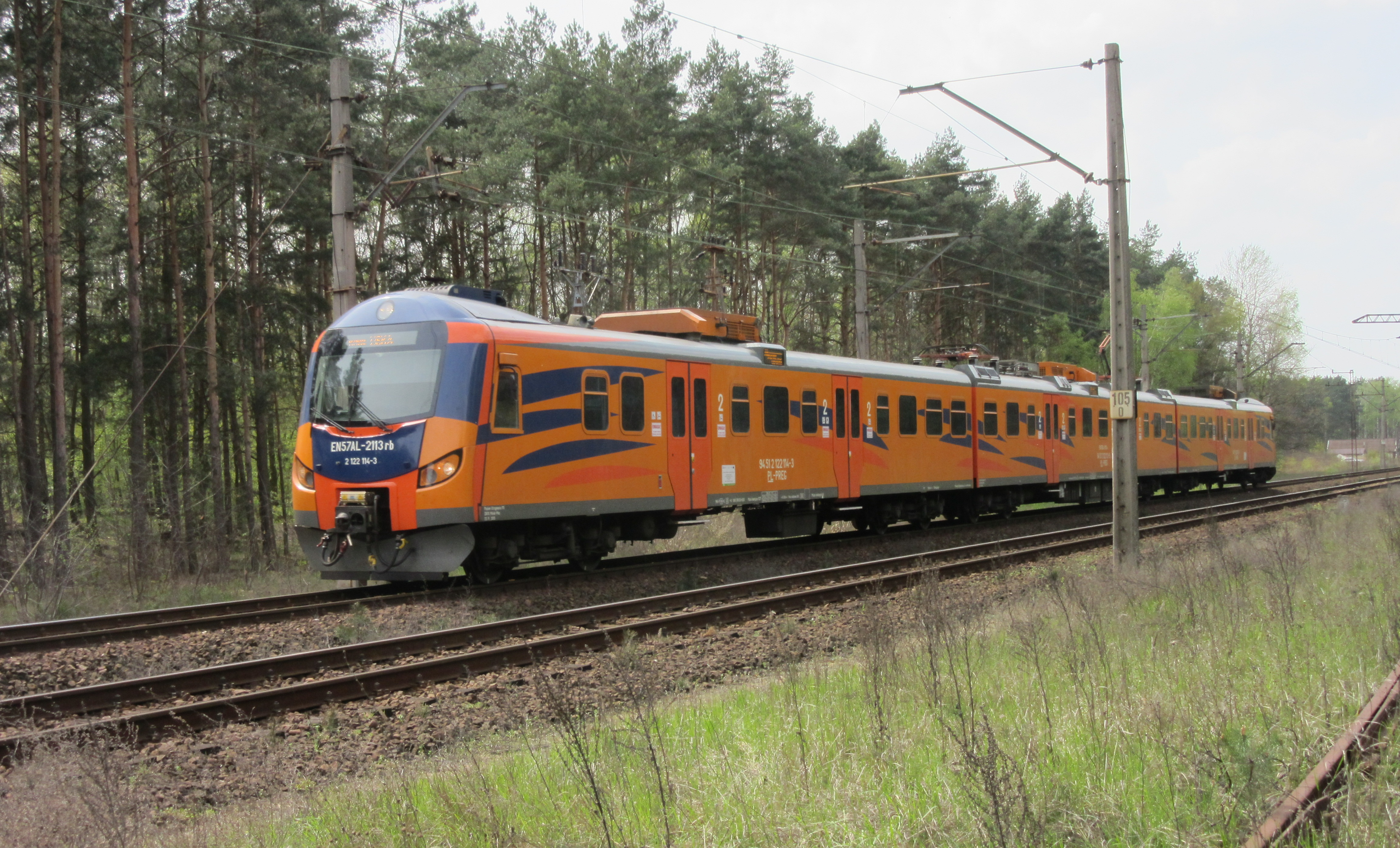
- An EN57AL EMU approaching Kalisz Winiary station

Overview
- Native name: Linia kolejowa Łódź Kaliska - Tuplice
- Status: In use
- Owner: PKP PLK
- Locale: Poland; Germany
- Termini: Łódź Kaliska, Łódź, Poland; Germany–Poland border near Forst (Lausitz)
- Continues from: 15 Łódź-Bednary railway
- Continues as: Cottbus–Forst railway
- Connecting lines: Łódź Kaliska: 25 to Dębica; Zduńska Wola (connectors with Coal Trunk Line): 739 to Karsznice; 810 to Szadek; Ostrów Wielkopolski: 272 Kluczbork-Poznań railway; 355 to Grabowno Wielkie; Krotoszyn (via Durzyn and Osusz); 281 Oleśnica-Chojnice railway; Leszno: 271 Wrocław-Poznań railway; 359 to Zbąszyń; Głogów: 273 Wrocław-Szczecin railway; Żagań: 275 to Wrocław; 389 to Jankowa Żagańska; Żary: 282 to Miłkowice; 370 to Zielona Góra

Service
- Type: Heavy rail
- Route number: 14 (Łódź Kaliska – Tuplice – State Border)

History
- Opened: 1846 (Głogów – Żagań), 1858 (Leszno – Głogów), 1871 (Żagań – Żary), 1872 (Żary – Forst), 1888 (Leszno – Ostrów Wlkp.), 1896 (Ostrów Wlkp. – Nowe Skalmierzyce), 1902 (Łódź –Kalisz), 1906 (Kalisz – Nowe Skalmierzyce)

Technical
- Line length: 388.577 km (241.451 mi)
- Number of tracks: 2 (Łódź Kaliska – Głogów); 1 (Głogów - Forst)
- Track gauge: 1,435 mm (4 ft 8 1/2 in) standard gauge
- Old gauge: 1,524 mm (5 ft) (Łódź – Kalisz – Nowe Skalmierzyce)
- Electrification: Overhead wire, 3000 V DC (Łódź Kaliska – Durzyn (branch post))
- Operating speed: 120 km/h (75 mph)

The Łódź Kaliska–Zasieki railway is a 388 kilometer-long railway line in Poland running between Łódź Kaliska station and the Germany–Poland border between Zasieki, Poland, and Forst (Lausitz), Germany. It is commonly used for passenger and freight services.

== History ==
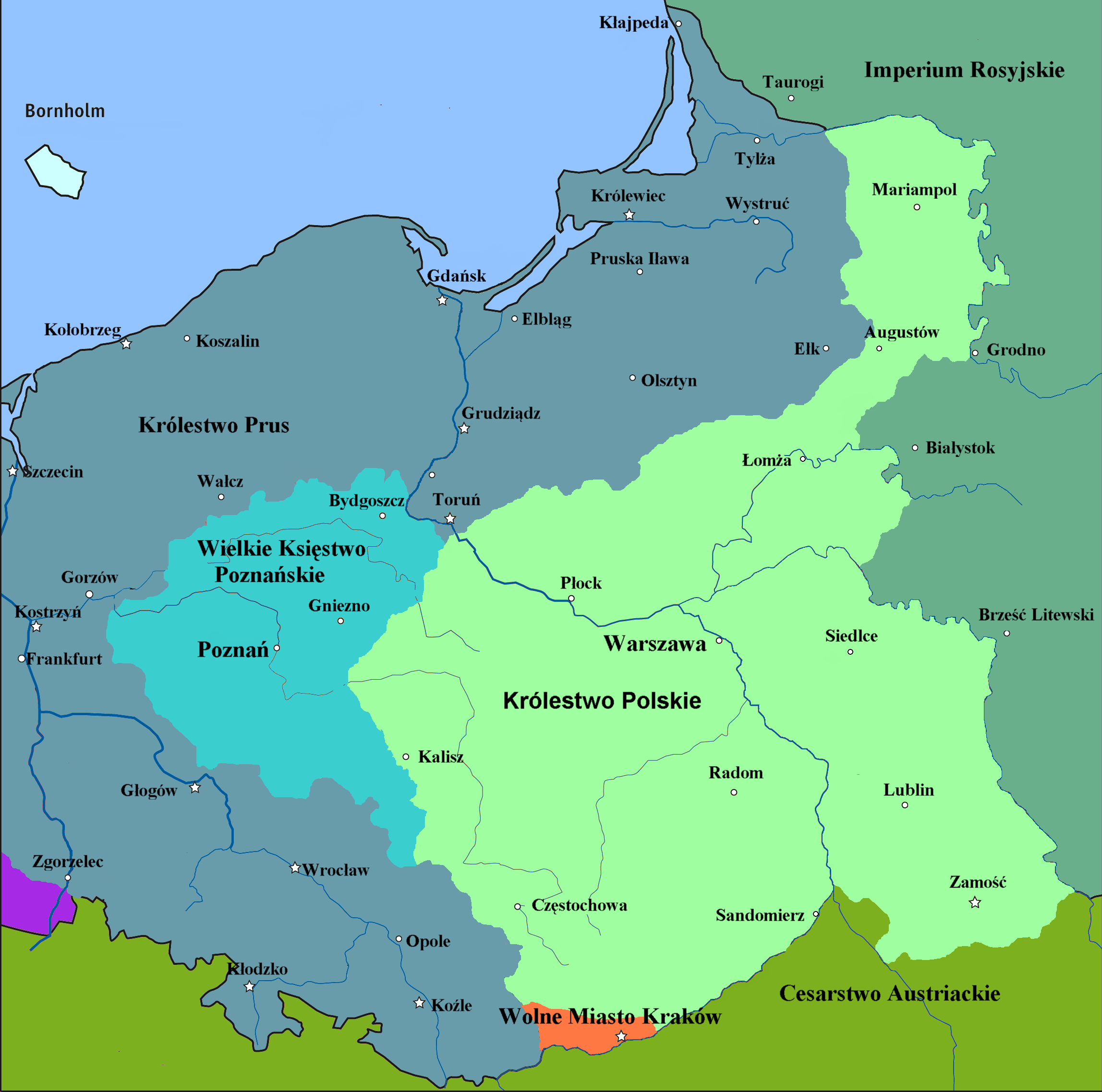
Poland in mid 19th century territory controlled by: Kingdom of Prussia with Grand Duchy of Poznań Russian empire with Congress Poland

The line consists of sections built during the 19th century and early 20th century, during the period of the Partitions of Poland opened in parts of the country which were under Prussia and former lands of Congress Poland, which was part of the Russian Empire.

The first section was opened in Prussian controlled Silesia by the Lower Silesian branch line Railway (Niederschlesische Zweigbahn) company on 1 October 1846, running between Głogów (German: Glogau) and Żagań (Sagan). On 30 December 1857, the Wrocław-Poznań-Głogów Railway (Breslau-Posen-Glogauer Eisenbahn) opened the stretch from Leszno (Lissa) in the Grand Duchy of Poznań to Grodziec Mały (Klein Gräditz) across the Odra river from Głogów, and on 18 May 1858 the subsequent section to Głogów, along with a bridge over the Odra. The next section was opened by the Lower Silesian branch line Railway Railway on 31 December 1871, from Żegań to Żary (Sorau). Half-a-year later, on 30 June 1872, the Halle-Sorau-Guben Railway extended its railway from Forst across the Nysa Łużycka to Żary.

In 1888, all railways in Prussia were nationalized, and a new section from Leszno to Ostrów Wielkopolski (Ostrowo) was opened on 1 October. The final Prussian section of the railway line was opened on 14 February 1896, from Ostrów Wielkopolski to Nowe Skalmierzyce (Neu Skalmierschütz), near the Russian-Prussian border.

In Russian Empire, the first section of the line was opened 15 November 1902, as part of Warsaw-Kalisz Railway, between the Łódź Kaliska station in Łódź and Kalisz. Unlike the Prussian railways, this section was built with the Russian broad gauge, which at the time had track gauge of 1,524 mm instead of the standard gauge of 1,435 mm. On 28 October 1906, a follow-up section to Nowe Skalmierzyce was built, along with new border station.

Track gauge was unified during World War I by the German military. Following the reestablishment of an independent Polish state in the aftermath of the war, and the victorious Greater Poland uprising, the part of the line from Łódź to Leszno came under control of the Second Polish Republic, while a segment from Wschowa remained in German hands until Germany's defeat in World War II. In the 1930s the line received a connection with the newly built Coal Trunk-Line, with a major junction in Karsznice, southeast to Zduńska Wola.

During World War II the railway's route was changed between Czekanów and Ostrów Wielkopolski, as well as on the Durzyn - Krotoszyn - Osusz section, where the Krotoszyn station was excluded from the line, and the former tracks leading to the station became the connectors with the main line.

The line was partially electrified in 1965, starting with the section from Łódź to Zduńska Wola. In 1973 the overhead wires were installed up to Sieradz station, followed 2 years later to Ostrów Wielkopolski, and in 1987 the section to Durzyn branch post, along with connector rail to Krotoszyn station, was electrified.

== Current condition ==
The railway line is listed by Polish government as the railway line of national importance. On the section from Łódź to Ostrów Wielkopolski it is used by PKP Intercity trains running between Warsaw and Wrocław, running through Skierniewice, Koluszki, Łódź, Sieradz and Kalisz, as well it serves as a backup route for trains usually running on the E-20 international railway, in case of a lack of possibility to run on it. Also, the section is commonly used by PolRegio regional trains running from Łódź to Poznań and Wrocław. On much shorter section, between Łódź and Sieradz, it is used by ŁKA commuter trains. Currently, the section is undergoing through refurbishment, which will allow raising the speed limit of the railway from 80 to 120 km/h.

The section between Ostrów Wielkopolski and Leszno stations, due to no electrification, is served with diesel units; one of significant routes on the railway is a train from Ostrów to Leszno ran by Greater Poland Railways. However, the electrification of this section is planned.

Section from Wschowa to Żagań stations used to be impassable due to deteriorated condition of the tracks and no passenger services scheduled for this route till December 2019, when the traffic was restored between Wschowa and Głogów. The section from Żagań to Żary is mostly served by diesel multiple units and freight trains powered by diesel locomotives
