= Forst (Lausitz) station =

Railway station in Forst (Lausitz), Germany

Forst (Lausitz) Baršć (Łužyca)
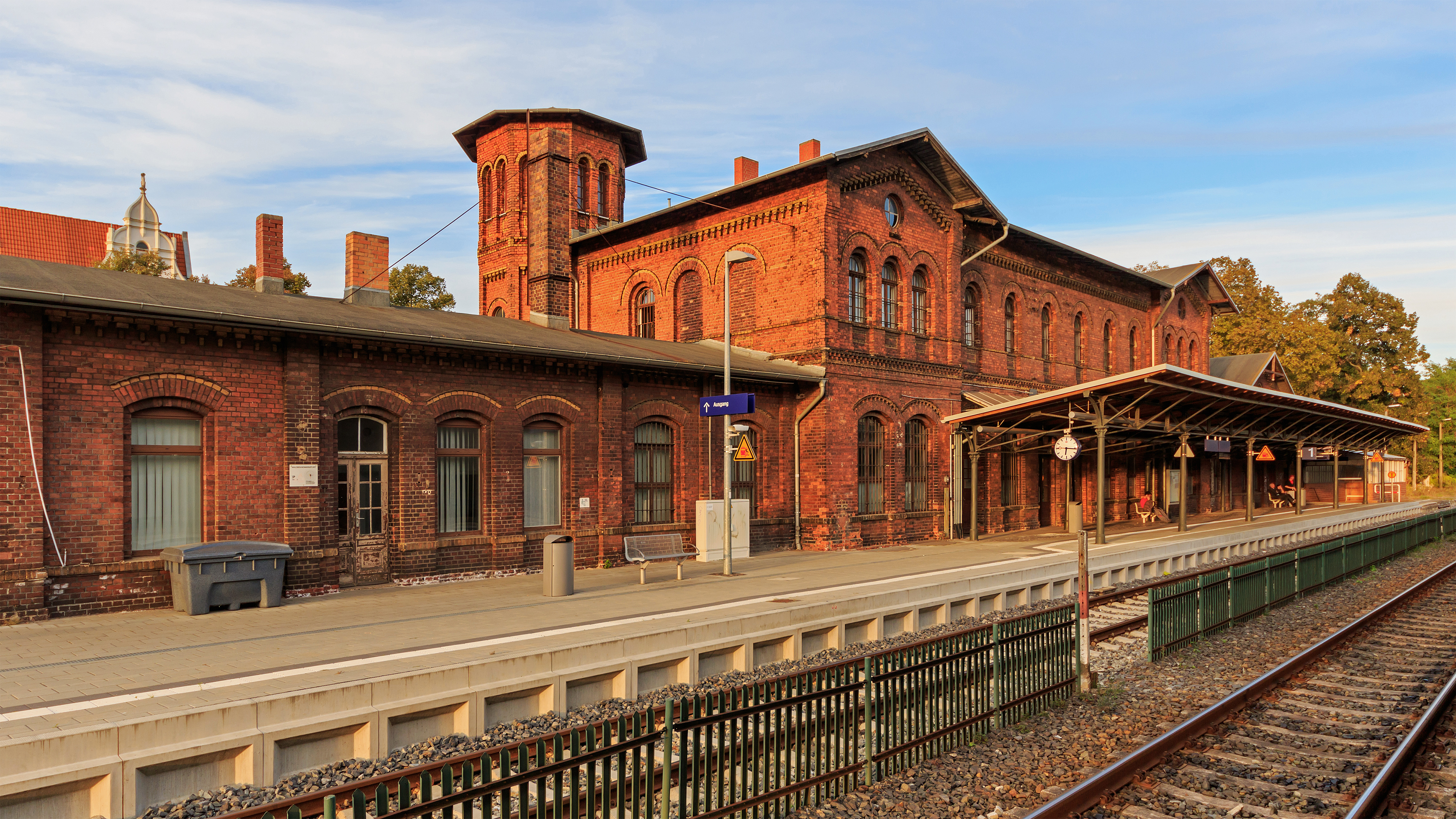
- Forst railway station

General information
- Location: Forst (Lausitz), Brandenburg; Germany
- Coordinates: 51.4422°N 14.3815°E
- Owner: DB Netz
- Operator: DB Station&Service
- Lines: Cottbus–Forst railway Forst–Guben railway Weißwasser–Forst railway
- Platforms: 3
- Train operators: DB Regio Nordost; Ostdeutsche Eisenbahn; Lower Silesian Railways

Other information
- Station code: 1834
- DS100 code: BFO
- IBNR: 8010111
- Category: 6
- Fare zone: VBB: 7275
- Website: www.bahnhof.de

Services
Preceding station	DB Regio Nordost	Following station
Klinge towards Cottbus Hbf	RB 93	Zasieki towards Żagań
Preceding station	Ostdeutsche Eisenbahn	Following station
Klinge towards Cottbus Hbf	RB 46	Terminus
Preceding station	KD	Following station
Terminus	D14	Zasieki towards Wroclaw Glowny
Location

Forst (Lausitz)/Baršć (Łužyca) (German: Bahnhof Forst (Lausitz), pronounced [ˈbaːnhoːf ˈfɔʁst ˈlaʊzɪts]; Lower Sorbian: Dwórnišćo Baršć (Łužyca)) is a border railway station located in Forst (Lausitz), Germany.

The station is located on the Cottbus–Forst railway and the former Forst–Guben and Weißwasser–Forst railway lines. A few hundred meters east of the station the German Cottbus–Forst railway connects to Poland's Łódź Kaliska–Tuplice railway.

== Train services ==
The station is serves by the following service(s):

- Local services RB 46 Cottbus – Forst (hourly)
- Local services RB 93 Forst – Żary (twice daily)
- Regional services (KD) Wrocław - Legnica - Żary - Forst (only on weekends)

Until mid-December 2014 the station was also served by EuroCity "Wawel", which used to run once daily between Berlin Hauptbahnhof and Wrocław Główny.

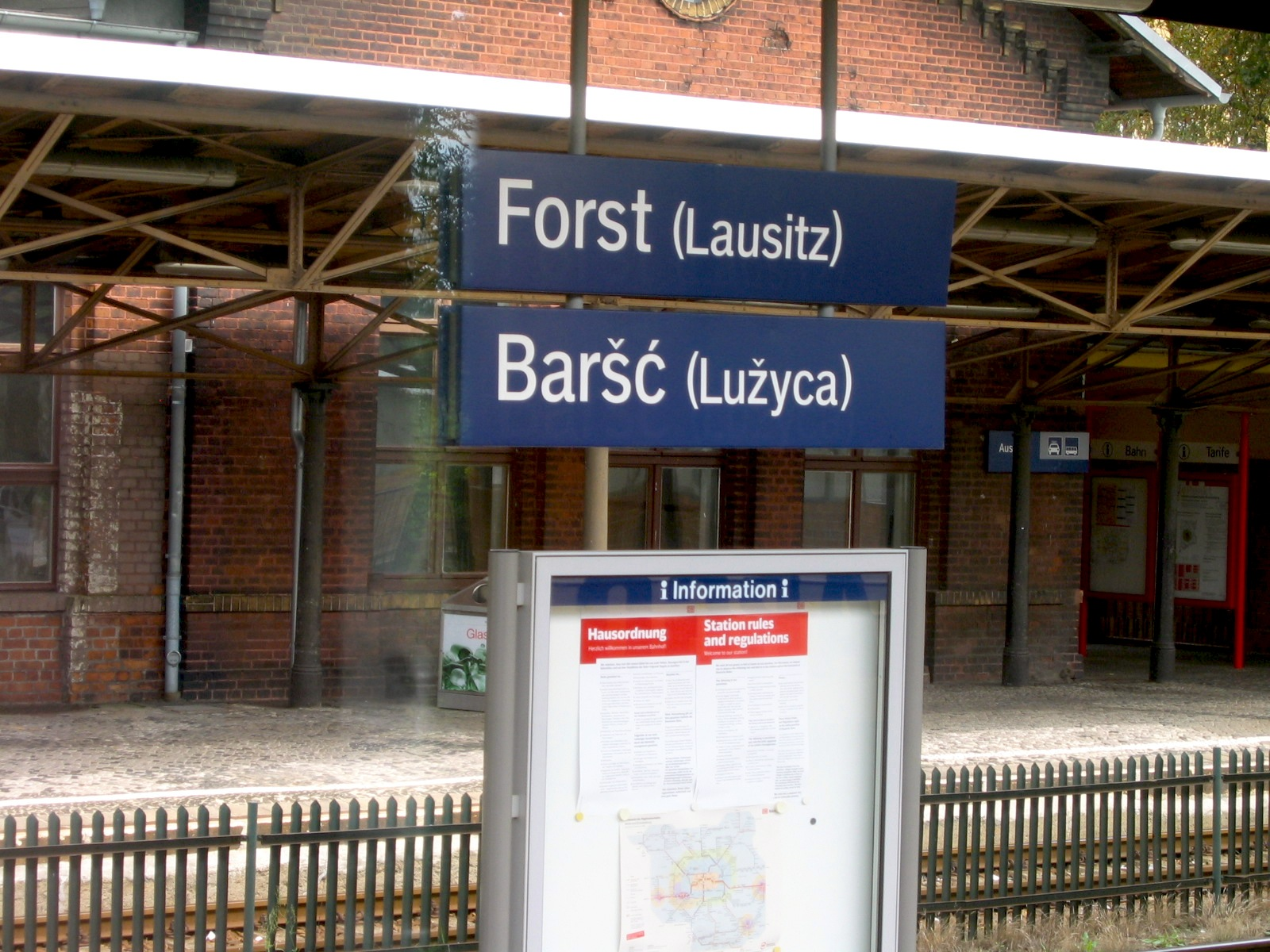
Bilingual station sign in German and Lower Sorbian: Forst (Lausitz)/Baršć (Łužyca)
