= Land Forces of the National People's Army =

Land Forces of the National People's Army Landstreitkräfte der Nationalen Volksarmee
- Active: 1 March 1956 – 2 October 1990
- Country: East Germany
- Size: 105,000 nominal, peacetime (1990); 394,350 nominal, wartime (1990)
- Part of: Kommando Landstreitkraefte (1972–1990)
- Headquarters: Geltow, Potsdam-Mittelmark
- March: Präsentiermasrch nationalevolksarmee (Slow March); Parademarsch № 1 der Nationalen Volksarmee (Parade March)

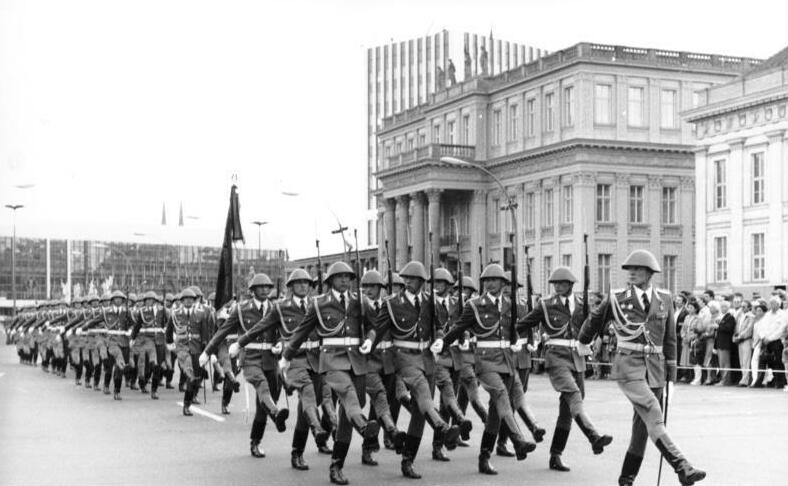
A company of Landstreitkräfte troops on parade in East Berlin, May 1985

The Land Forces of the National People's Army (German: Landstreitkräfte der Nationalen Volksarmee – LaSK) was the ground-based military branch of the German Democratic Republic (GDR) National People's Army (NPA). The Land Forces Command, located at Geltow, was established on 1 December 1972 as a management body created for the land forces. The NPA itself was created on March 1, 1956, from the Kasernierte Volkspolizei (Barracked People's Police).

== Organisation ==
Peacetime organisation of the Landstreitkräfte in 1986

The LaSK had a peacetime organisation since 1972 under the command of the Kommando Landstreitkräfte (Kdo. LaSK). Its largest formations between 1956 and 1990 were the Military Districts III and V, which generally consisted of three active divisions each, plus training, combat support and logistic units. The 1st Motor Rifle Division was additionally attached to the Military District V, but was designated to leave that formation in wartime to play a key role in the assault on West Berlin. The 6th Motor Rifle Division existed only for two years (1956–1958) as an active formation.

While the two districts held the bulk of the GDR's land forces, additional artillery- and support elements, as well as the paratroopers of the 40th Paratrooper Battalion (upgraded to the 40th Air Assault Regiment in 1986) were under direct command of the Kdo. LaSK.

In wartime both military districts would form field armies: the 3rd Army in the south, reinforced by the GDR 6th, 10th, and 17th reserve divisions, and the 5th Army in the north, reinforced by the Soviet 94th Guards Motor Rifle Division and the 138th and 221st Separate Tank Regiments from the GSFG. Both armies would have been commanded by the Soviet high-command, while the Kommando Landstreitkräfte was to focus on the military supply chain, medical services, internal security and assist in the capture of West Berlin.

== Order of battle (1980s) ==
=== Military District V ===
Artist's rendering of a T-34-85 in service with the Landstreitkräfte

The headquarters of Military District V in the north was in Neubrandenburg.

1st Motor Rifle Division (Potsdam)

- 1st Motor Rifle Regiment "Hans Beimler"
- 2nd Motor Rifle Regiment "Arthur Ladwig"
- 3rd Motor Rifle Regiment "Paul Hegenbart"
- 1st Panzer Regiment "Friedrich Wolf"
- 1st Artillery Regiment "Rudolf Gyptner"
- 1st AA-Missile Regiment "Anton Fischer"
- 1st Rocket Detachment "Rudi Arndt"
- 1st Heavy Mortar Detachment "Hermann Rentzsch"
- 1st Reconnaissance Battalion "Dr. Richard Sorge"
- 1st Engineer Battalion "Willi Becker"
- 1st Light AT Detachment "Willy Sägebrecht"
- 1st Signal Battalion "Bodo Uhse"
- 1st Logistical Security Battalion "Georg Handke"
- 1st Repair Battalion "Otto Schliwinski"
- 1st Chemical Defence Battalion "Herbert Kittelmann"
- 1st Medical Battalion
- 1st Replacement Regiment

8th Motor Rifle Division (Schwerin)

- 27th Motor Rifle Regiment "Hans Kahle"
- 28th Motor Rifle Regiment "Wilhelm Florin"
- 29th Motor Rifle Regiment "Ernst Moritz Arndt"
- 8th Panzer Regiment "Artur Becker"
- 8th Artillery Regiment "Erich Mühsam"
- 8th AA-Missile Regiment "Willi Schröder"
- 8th Rocket Detachment "Hermann Schuldt"
- 8th Heavy Mortar Detachment "Mathias Thesen"
- 8th Reconnaissance Battalion "Otto Moritz"
- 8th Engineer Battalion "Tudor Vladimirescu"
- 8th Light AT Detachment "Heinrich Dollwetzel"
- 8th Signal Battalion "Kurt Bürger"
- 8th Logistical Security Battalion "Herbert Tschäpe"
- 8th Repair Battalion "Wilhelm Pieck"
- 8th Chemical Defence Battalion "Erich Correns"
- 8th Medical Battalion "Hans Rodenberg"
- 8th Replacement Regiment

9th Panzer Division (Eggesin)

- 21st Panzer Regiment "Walter Empacher"
- 22nd Panzer Regiment "Soja Kosmodemjanskaja"
- 23rd Panzer Regiment "Julian Marchlewski"
- 9th Motor Rifle Regiment "Rudolf Renner"
- 9th Artillery Regiment "Hans Fischer"
- 9th AA-Missile Regiment "Rudolf Dölling"
- 9th Rocket Detachment "Otto Nuschk"
- 9th Heavy Mortar Detachment "Friedrich Ebert"
- 9th Reconnaissance Battalion "Eduard Claudius"
- 9th Engineer Battalion
- 9th Signal Battalion "Adolf Bytzeck"
- 9th Logistical Security Battalion "Robert Stamm"
- 9th Repair Battalion "Paul Dessau"
- 9th Chemical Defence Battalion "Michael Niederkirchner"
- 9th Medical Battalion "Wolfgang Langhoff"
- 9th Replacement Regiment

=== Military District III (South) ===
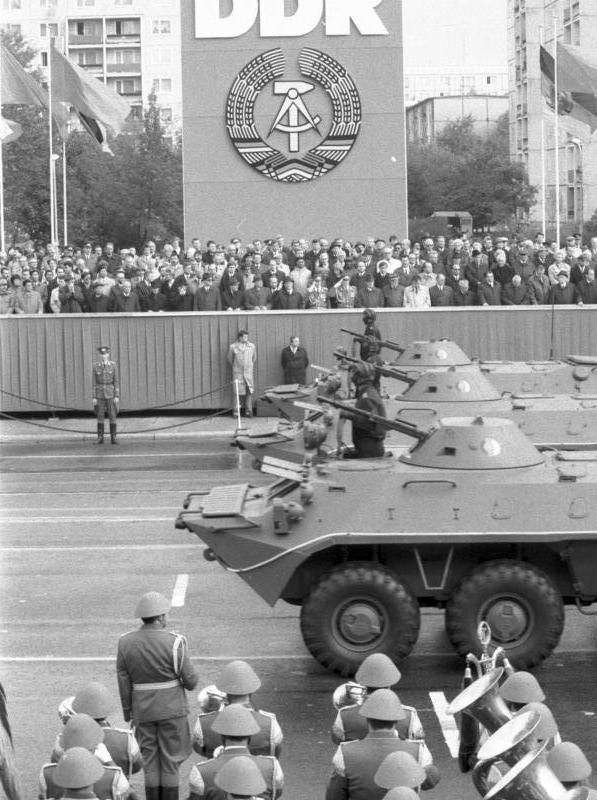
BTR-70s on parade in East Berlin, 1989

The headquarters of the southern district was in Leipzig.

4th Motor Rifle Division (Erfurt)

- 22nd Motor Rifle Regiment "Thomas Müntzer"
- 23rd Motor Rifle Regiment "Anton Saefkow"
- 24th Motor Rifle Regiment "John Scheer"
- 4th Panzer Regiment "August Bebel"
- 4th Artillery Regiment "Willi Bredel"
- 4th AA-Missile Regiment "Hermann Danz"
- 4th Rocket Detachment "Hugo Gräf"
- 4th Heavy Mortar Detachment "Otto Franke"
- 4th Reconnaissance Battalion "Wilhelm Girnus"
- 4th Engineer Battalion "Walter Gorrish"
- 4th Light AT Detachment "Franz Jacob"
- 4th Signal Battalion "Wilhelm Liebknecht"
- 4th Logistical Security Battalion "Ernst Putz"
- 4th Repair Battalion "Wilhelm Leuschner"
- 4th Chemical Defence Battalion "Lothar Bolz"
- 4th Medical Battalion
- 4th Replacement Regiment

7th Panzer Division (Dresden)

- 14th Panzer Regiment "Karol Swierczewski"
- 15th Panzer Regiment "Paul Hornick"
- 16th Panzer Regiment "Leo Jogiches"
- 7th Motor Rifle Regiment "Max Roscher"
- 7th Artillery Regiment "Albert Hößler"
- 7th AA-Missile Regiment "Paul Rockstroh"
- 7th Rocket Detachment "Alfred Kurella"
- 7th Heavy Mortar Detachment "Ernst Schneller"
- 7th Reconnaissance Battalion "Ludvik Svoboda"
- 7th Engineer Battalion "Arthur Thiermann"
- 7th Signal Battalion "Egon Dreger"
- 7th Logistical Security Battalion "Kurt Schlosser"
- 7th Repair Battalion "Gustav Schneider"
- 7th Chemical Defence Battalion "Johannes Eggert"
- 7th Medical Battalion
- 7th Replacement Regiment

11th Motor Rifle Division (Halle)

- 16th Motor Rifle Regiment "Robert Uhrig"
- 17th Motor Rifle Regiment "Fritz Weineck"
- 18th Motor Rifle Regiment "Otto Schlag"
- 11th Panzer Regiment "Otto Buchwitz"
- 11th Artillery Regiment "Wilhelm Koenen"
- 11th AA-Missile Regiment "Georg Stöber"
- 11th Rocket Detachment "Magnus Poser"
- 11th Heavy Mortar Detachment "Otto Gotsche"
- 11th Reconnaissance Battalion "Heinrich Brandes"
- 11th Engineer Battalion "Willi Gall"
- 11th Light AT Detachment "Hermann Vogt"
- 11th Signal Battalion "Otto Brosowski"
- 11th Logistical Security Battalion "Bernhard Koenen"
- 11th Repair Battalion "Albert Funk"
- 11th Chemical Defence Battalion "Edwin Hörnle"
- 11th Medical Battalion "Louis Kugelmann"
- 11th Replacement Regiment

=== Second line divisions ===
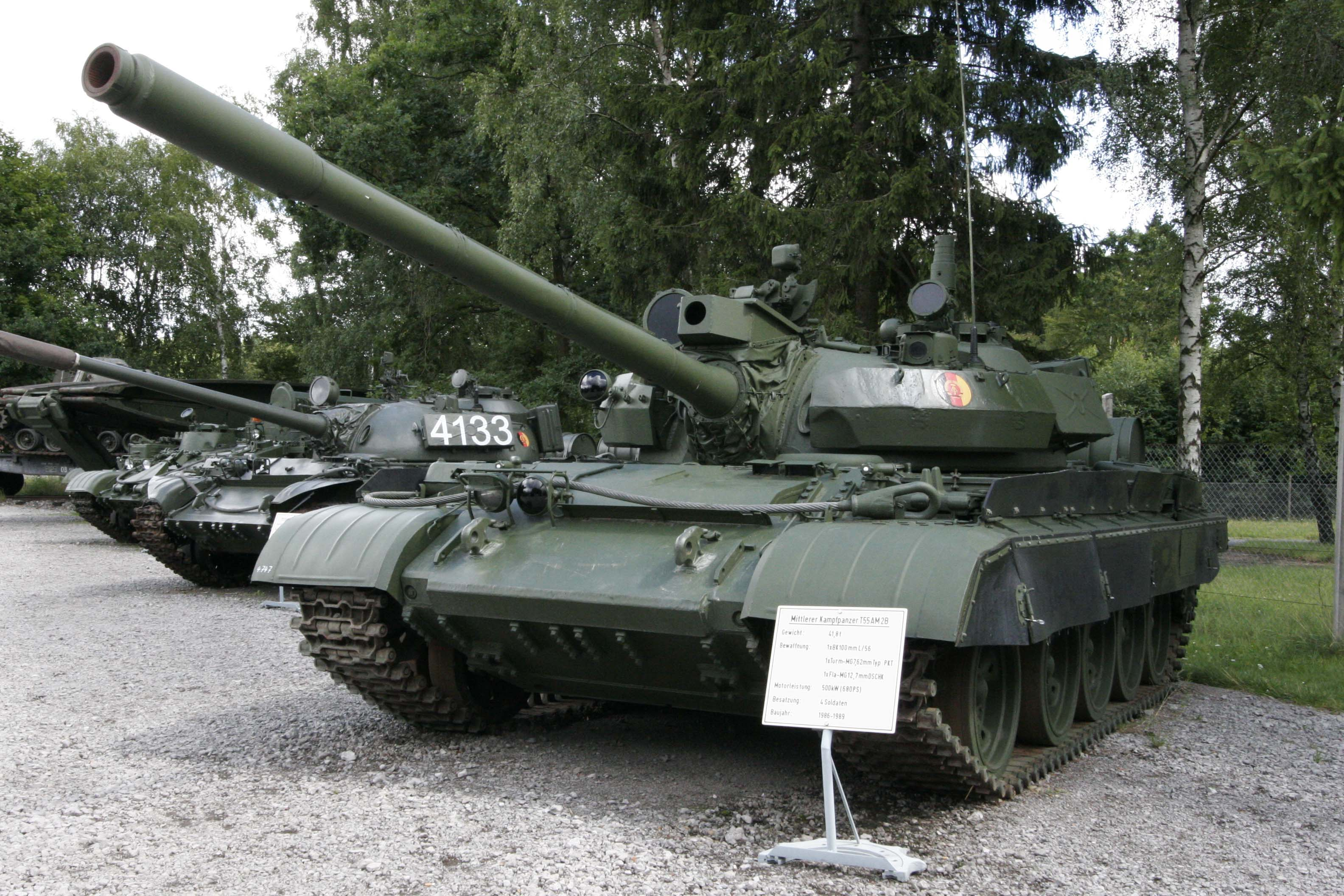
A T-55AM2B on display at the Panzermuseum in Münster

In the event of a full-scale mobilisation, the six regular divisions of the NVA would have been supplemented by three mobilisation divisions and two reserve divisions. All five divisions would be mobilised on M+2. The cadre of each mobilisation/reserve division remained on hand as the regular staff of training centers/non-commissioned officer (NCO) schools. The five second line divisions were the 6th Motor Rifle Division (Königswartha), the 10th Motor Rifle Division (Ronneburg), the 17th Motor Rifle Division (Petersroda), the 19th Motor Rifle Division (Wulkow, which was not based on a training centre), and the 20th Motor Rifle Division (Bredenfelde).

Mobilisation Divisions – command of the Military District III of land forces (Leipzig)

6th Motor Rifle Division (Königswartha)

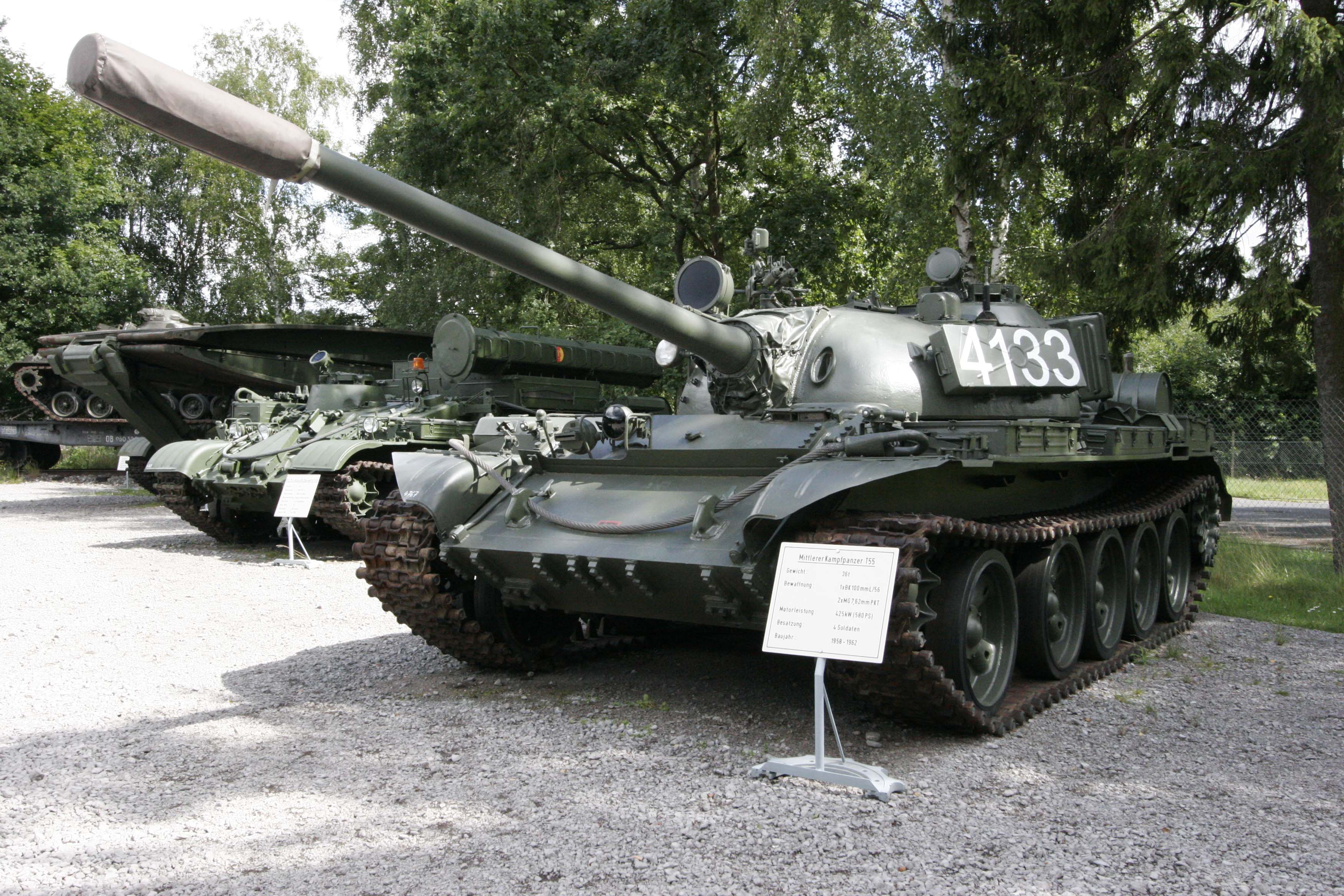
A T-55A at the Panzermuseum

- 11th Motor Rifle Regiment
- 12th Motor Rifle Regiment
- 13th Motor Rifle Regiment
- 6th Panzer Regiment
- 6th Artillery Regiment
- 6th AA-Missile Regiment
- 6th Rocket Detachment
- 6th Heavy Mortar Detachment
- 6th Reconnaissance Battalion
- 6th Engineer Battalion
- 6th Light AT Detachment
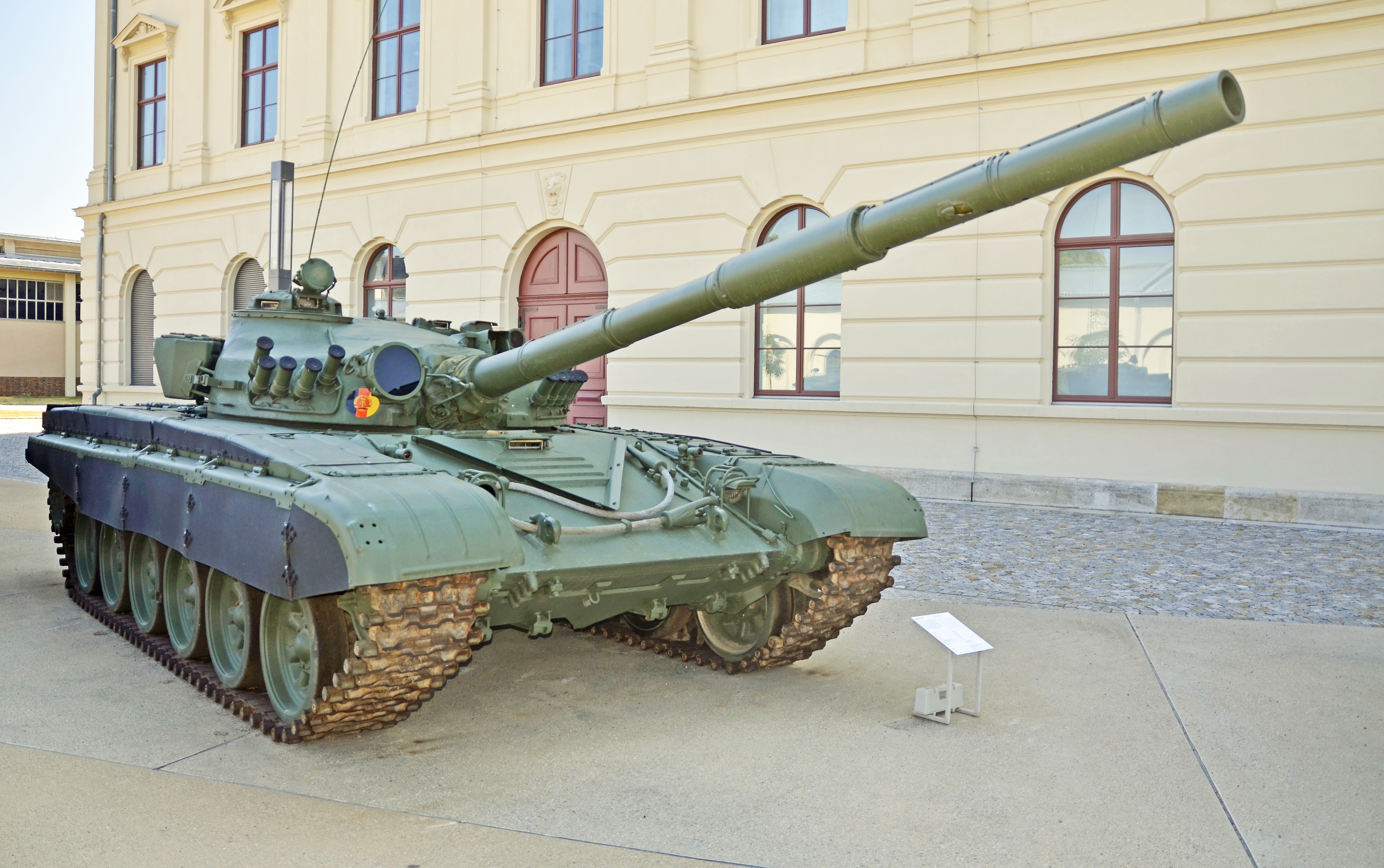
  T-72M at the German Army Tank Museum in Dresden in 2013
- 6th Signal Battalion
- 6th Logistical Security Battalion
- 6th Repair Battalion
- 6th Chemical Defence Battalion
- 6th Medical Battalion
- 6th Replacement Regiment

10th Motor Rifle Division (Ronneburg)

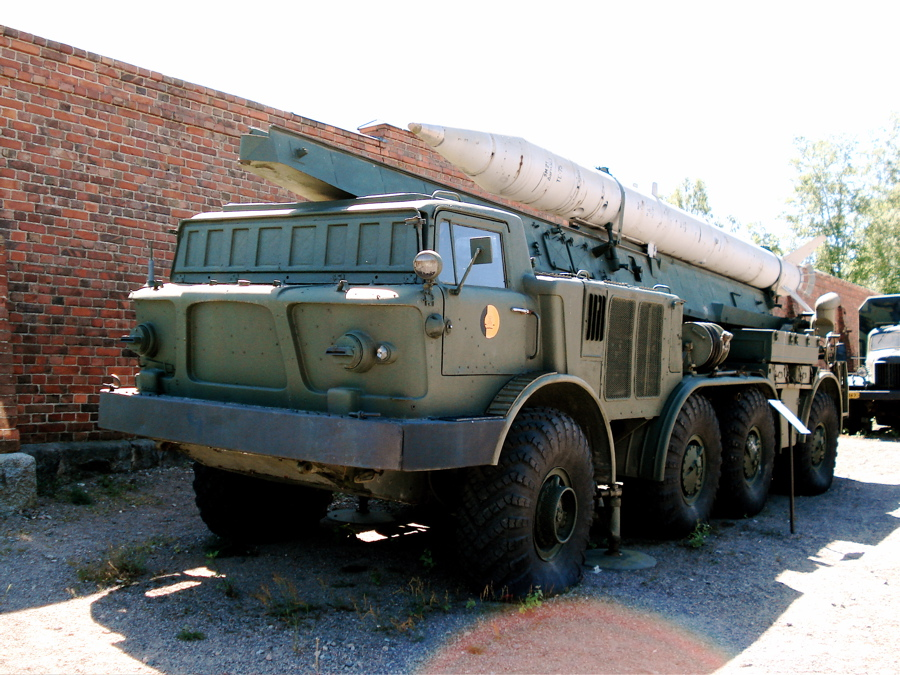
A former Landstreitkräfte ZIL-135 truck configured as a FROG-7B (Luna-M) missile system, displayed in the Hämeenlinna Artillery Museum

- 14th Motor Rifle Regiment
- 15th Motor Rifle Regiment
- 16th Motor Rifle Regiment
- 10th Panzer Regiment
- 10th Artillery Regiment
- 10th AA-Missile Regiment
- 10th Rocket Detachment
- 10th Heavy Mortar Detachment
- 10th Reconnaissance Battalion
- 10th Engineer Battalion
- 10th Light AT Detachment
- 10th Signal Battalion
- 10th Logistical Security Battalion
- 10th Repair Battalion
- 10th Chemical Defence Battalion
- 10th Medical Battalion
- 10th Replacement Regiment

17th Motor Rifle Division (Petersroda)

- 41st Motor Rifle Regiment
- 42nd Motor Rifle Regiment
- 43rd Motor Rifle Regiment
- 17th Panzer Regiment
- 17th Artillery Regiment
- 17th AA-Missile Regiment
- 17th Rocket Detachment
- 17th Heavy Mortar Detachment
- 17th Reconnaissance Battalion
- 17th Engineer Battalion
- 17th Light AT Detachment
- 17th Signal Battalion
- 17th Logistical Security Battalion
- 17th Repair Battalion
- 17th Chemical Defence Battalion
- 17th Medical Battalion
- 17th Replacement Regiment

Reserve divisions – command of the Military District V of land forces (Neubrandenburg)

19th Motor Rifle Division (Wulkow)

- 51st Motor Rifle Regiment
- 52nd Motor Rifle Regiment
- 53rd Motor Rifle Regiment
- 19th Panzer Regiment
- 19th Artillery Regiment
- 19th AA-Missile Regiment
- 19th Rocket Detachment
- 19th Heavy Mortar Detachment
- 19th Reconnaissance Battalion
- 19th Engineer Battalion
- 19th Light AT Detachment
- 19th Signal Battalion
- 19th Logistical Security Battalion
- 19th Repair Battalion
- 19th Chemical Defence Battalion
- 19th Medical Battalion
- 19th Replacement Regiment

20th Motor Rifle Division (Bredenfelde)

- 33rd Motor Rifle Regiment
- 34th Motor Rifle Regiment
- 35th Motor Rifle Regiment
- 20th Panzer Regiment
- 20th Artillery Regiment
- 20th AA-Missile Regiment
- 20th Rocket Detachment
- 20th Heavy Mortar Detachment
- 20th Reconnaissance Battalion
- 20th Engineer Battalion
- 20th Light AT Detachment
- 20th Signal Battalion
- 20th Logistical Security Battalion
- 20th Repair Battalion
- 20th Chemical Defence Battalion
- 20th Medical Battalion
- 20th Replacement Regiment

=== Aviation units ===
- Kampfhubschraubergeschwader 3 (KHG-3) "Ferdinand von Schill", Cottbus
  - I. Hubschrauberstaffel/KHG-3 (I.HS/KHG-3), Mi-8TB
  - II. Hubschrauberstaffel/KHG-3 (II.HS/KHG-3), Mi-24D
    - KHG-3 maintained several detachments:
      - FTK-512 at Neuhaus-Steinheid
      - FTK-514 at Kreuzebra
      - GR-9 at Meiningen
  - Hubschrauberstaffel der Führung und Aufklarung 3 (HSFA-3), Mi-2, Mi-8PS, Mi-9
- Kampfhubschraubergeschwader 5 (KHG-5) "Adolf von Lützow", Basepohl
  - I. Hubschrauberstaffel/KHG-5 (I.HS/KHG-5), Mi-8TB
  - II. Hubschrauberstaffel/KHG-5 (II.HS/KHG-5), Mi-24D
  - III. Hubschrauberstaffel/KHG-5 (III.HS/KHG-5), Mi-24P
    - KHG-5 maintained several detachments:
      - FTK-432 at Gross Molzahn
      - FTK-613 at Athenstedt
      - FTK-614 at Altensalzwedel
  - Hubschrauberstaffel der Führung und Aufklarung 5 (HSFA-5), Mi-2, Mi-8PS. Mi-9

=== Other units ===
The Kommando Landstreitkräfte also contained some specially trained units – like the 40th Paratrooper Battalion (later the 40th Air Assault Regiment "Willi Sänger"). The structure and equipment was mostly of Soviet design, and the NVA operated in close collaboration with the Group of Soviet Forces in Germany. There were also reports of a special NVA diversionary battalion in south Germany equipped with M-48s and M-113s, to cause confusion amongst NATO forces (emulating and improving on the example of Otto Skorzeny's 150th Panzer Brigade during the Ardennes Offensive). However, more recent reports throw doubt on the existence of any such unit.

== Types of units ==
Divisions

- Motorisierte-Schützen-Division (motorised/mechanised infantry division)
- Panzerdivision (tank/armoured division)

Regiments

- Artillerieregiment (artillery regiment)
- Panzerregiment (tank/armoured regiment)
- Ersatzregiment (replacement regiment)
- Fla-Raketen Regiment (AA-missile regiment)
- Mot.-Schützenregiment (motor rifle/mechanised infantry regiment)

Battalions

- Aufklärungsbatallion (reconnaissance battalion)
- Battalion Chemische Abwehr (chemical defence battalion)
- Battalion Materielle Sicherstellung (logistical security battalion)
- Instandsetzungsbatallion (repair battalion)
- Nachrichtenbatallion (signal battalion)
- Pionierbatallion (engineer battalion)
- Sanitätsbatallion (medical battalion)

Detachments

- Panzerjägerabteilung (light AT detachment)
- Raketenabteilung (rocket detachment)
- Geschosswerferabteilung (heavy mortar detachment)

== Equipment ==
=== Small Arms ===
Name	Country of origin	Type	Notes	Image
Walther PP	Nazi Germany; East Germany	Semi-automatic pistol		
Pistole-M	Soviet Union; East Germany	Semi-automatic pistol		
Nagant M1895	Russian Empire; USSR	Revolver	Imported in small numbers and saw little use	
PPSh-41	Soviet Union	Submachine gun	Designated as MPi 41	
FB PM-63	Polish People's Republic	Submachine gun		
Mauser Kar98k	Nazi Germany	Bolt action rifle	In use by the Combat Groups of the Working Class and remained in standard use until the 1960s and continued its service in limited circumstances	
Mosin–Nagant	Soviet Union	Bolt action rifle	In use by the Combat Groups of the Working Class and in remained standard use until the 1960s and continued its service in limited circumstances	
SKS	Soviet Union; East Germany	Semi-automatic carbine	Manufactured domestically as the Karabiner-S and used for ceremonial occasions	
StG 44	Nazi Germany	Assault rifle	Left over from World War II, used until the early 1960s. Relabeled as MPi 44	
AKM	Soviet Union	Assault rifle	Manufactured by the state arsenal as the MPi-KM (fixed stock, later variants were distinctive stippled plastic) and MPi-KMS-72 (AKMS) with a single strut "coathanger" side-folding stock	
AK-74	Soviet Union; East Germany	Assault rifle	MPi-AK-74N, MPi-AKS-74N, MPi-AKS-74NK variants made by the state arsenal for a short period of time starting in 1983 (withdrawn from service after German reunification)	
RPK	Soviet Union	Light machine gun		
RPD	Soviet Union; Polish People's Republic	Light machine gun		
PKM	Soviet Union	General-purpose machine gun		
Dragunov SVD	Soviet Union	Designated marksman rifle		
RPG-7D	Soviet Union	Light AT weapon		
RPG-18	Soviet Union	Light AT weapon		

=== Armoured Vehicles ===
Name	Country of origin	Type	Quantity	Notes
BMP-1	Soviet Union; Czechoslovak Socialist Republic	Infantry fighting vehicle	1,133	The West-German Bundeswehr obtained 851 vehicles after 1990 (mainly BMP-1P). They were brought to NATO standards, known as the BMP-1A1 Ost. 764 were extant (remainder sold) in 1994, and only 450 in 1996. The remainder were scrapped or sold, including 110 previously to Finland unmodified. 501 BMP-1A1 Ost were sold to Greece in 1993–1994, 350 to Sweden also.
BMP-2	Soviet Union; Czechoslovak Socialist Republic	Infantry fighting vehicle	24	Tracked IFVs in first-line Panzergrenadier units
BA-64	Soviet Union	Armoured patrol car	115	
BRDM-1	Soviet Union	Amphibious armoured patrol car	150	30 in 1960, 35 ea. in 1961 & 1962; 50 of antitank variant in 1965
BRDM-2	Soviet Union	Amphibious armoured patrol car	1,848	1,579 base (1966–75); plus antitank variants: 48 w/ AT-2 (1971-2), 169 w/ AT-3 (1973-6), & 52 w/ AT-5 (1980-3)
BTR-40	Soviet Union	Armoured personnel carrier	300	150 in 1956; 150 in 1957
BTR-50	Soviet Union	Amphibious armored personnel carrier	200	50/yr from 1959-1962
BTR-60	Soviet Union	Armoured personnel carrier	2,260	
BTR-70	Soviet Union	Armoured personnel carrier	1,316	Wheeled APCs in mechanised and motorised units
BTR-80	Soviet Union	Armoured personnel carrier		Wheeled APCs in mechanised and motorised units
BTR-152	Soviet Union	Armoured personnel carrier	759	delivered 1956-1961
MT-LB	Soviet Union	Armoured personnel carrier	721	
SU-76	Soviet Union	Assault gun	260	
SU-85	Soviet Union	Tank destroyer		
SU-100	Soviet Union	Tank destroyer	50	
ASU-57	Soviet Union	Airborne Assault gun	20	
ASU-85	Soviet Union	Airborne Assault gun		
PT-76	Soviet Union	Amphibious Light tank	170	
T-34	Soviet Union	Medium tank	872	In service as first MBT of the NVA Land Forces from 1952 to 1965. Afterward, used only in modified recovery/engineering versions
T-54	Soviet Union	Main battle tank	690	In reserve service throughout the 1980s
T-55	Soviet Union	Main battle tank	2,099	Upgraded to T-55AM standard in limited numbers; many T-55As remained in service in motor-rifle & reserve divisions
T-72	Soviet Union	Main battle tank	583	Phased in to replace the T-55 starting in the 1970s; priority given to first-line Panzer units

=== Field artillery and rocket artillery ===
==== Rocket systems ====
- 9K52 Luna-M — 24 in service 1980.
- R-11 Zemlya, R-17 Elbrus (Scud-A, Scud-B) – 24 launchers plus decoys, retired 1990
- OTR-21 Tochka
- OTR-23 Oka
- BM-21 Grad — 72 units.
- RM-70 — 265 RM-70 and RM-70M; delivered to Greece after the collapse of East Germany. 36 sold to Finland in 1991.

==== Towed artillery ====
- 100 mm anti-tank gun T-12 267.
- 122 mm howitzer 2A18 (D-30)
- 152 mm towed gun-howitzer M1955 (D-20)137 supplied in 1974–1975, passed to Germany after German unification. 126 sold to Finland.
- 130 mm towed field gun M1954 (M-46) 175.
- 85 mm divisional gun D-44

==== Self-propelled artillery ====
- 2S1 Gvozdika
- 2S3 Akatsiya. 95

==== Mortars ====
- 82-BM-37
- 2S12 Sani
- 120-PM-43 mortar

=== Air defense artillery systems ===
==== Mobile missile ====
- 2K11 Krug
- 2K12 Kub
- 9K31 Strela-1 on BRDM-2 chassis. 24 launchers acquired between 1977 and 1981
- 9K35 Strela-10 on MT-LB chassis
- 9K33 Osa. 41 Osa-AK. 39 sold to Greece after the German reunification.

==== Mobile self-propelled AA guns ====
- ZSU-23-4 Shilka. 131 were delivered from USSR, passed on to Germany after the German reunification.
- ZSU-57-2. 129 ordered in 1957 from Soviet Union and delivered between 1957 and 1961.Replaced by ZSU-23-4 "Shilka" SPAAGs between 1967 and 1974. It was completely removed from East German service in 1979. Some were converted into the FAB 500U driver training vehicle. They were passed on to the unified German state.

==== Towed anti-aircraft gun ====
- ZPU
- ZU-23-2
- S-60

=== Aircraft ===
==== Helicopters ====
- Mil Mi-2 Hoplite
- Mil Mi-8 and Mi-9 Hip
- Mil Mi-24 Hind
