= Luftsturmregiment 40 =

German air assault infantry unit

Air Assault Regiment 40
- Luftsturmregiment 40
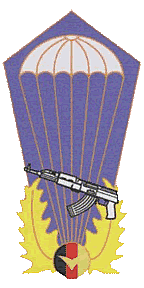
- Air Assault insignia (replica)
- Active: 1986–1991
- Country: East Germany (1986–1990); Germany (from 1990)
- Branch: Land Forces of the National People's Army (1986–1990); German Army (1990–1991)
- Type: Air assault infantry
- Role: Airborne forces Air assault Special forces
- Size: Regiment (50 (HQ), approximately 800 (including services))
- Part of: Under the East German Army Staff; Under the German Army Staff
- Garrison/HQ: Military Training Area Lehnin
- Colors: Orange
- Engagements: None

Insignia
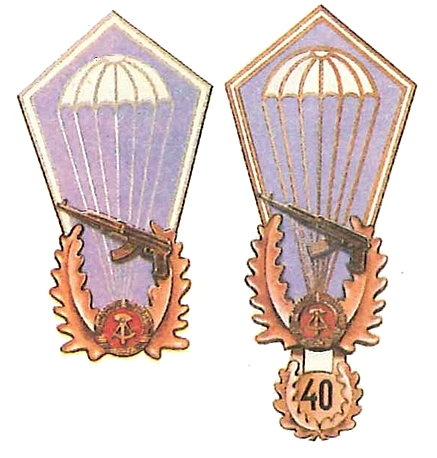
- Basic NVA Parachutist's Badge (left) and the NVA Parachutist's Badge displaying the device awarded after 40 jumps (right)

The Luftsturmregiment 40 (LStR-40) "Willi Sänger" (English: Air Assault Regiment 40) was a air assault infantry unit of the German Democratic Republic's National People's Army. It was formed in 1986 by expanding the existing Parachute Battalion 40 with additional air assault companies and support capability. It was directly subordinate to the Land Forces Command (Kommando Landstreitkräfte) of the East German Army.

Although initially formed based on the parachute battalion, this unit had a different mission and organization. The Luftsturmregiment 40 came about as the result of a change in Soviet tactics based on their recent experience in Afghanistan. These tactics emphasized the more mobile warfare afforded by the use of helicopter air assault operations. While LStR 40 retained in full the airborne capability of its predecessor unit, more emphasis was placed on readiness to conduct air assault operations than had previously been the case.

Like its predecessor unit, the Luftsturmregiment 40 carried the added title "Willi Sänger," in honor of a famed German Communist and resistance fighter against the Nazis.

== History ==
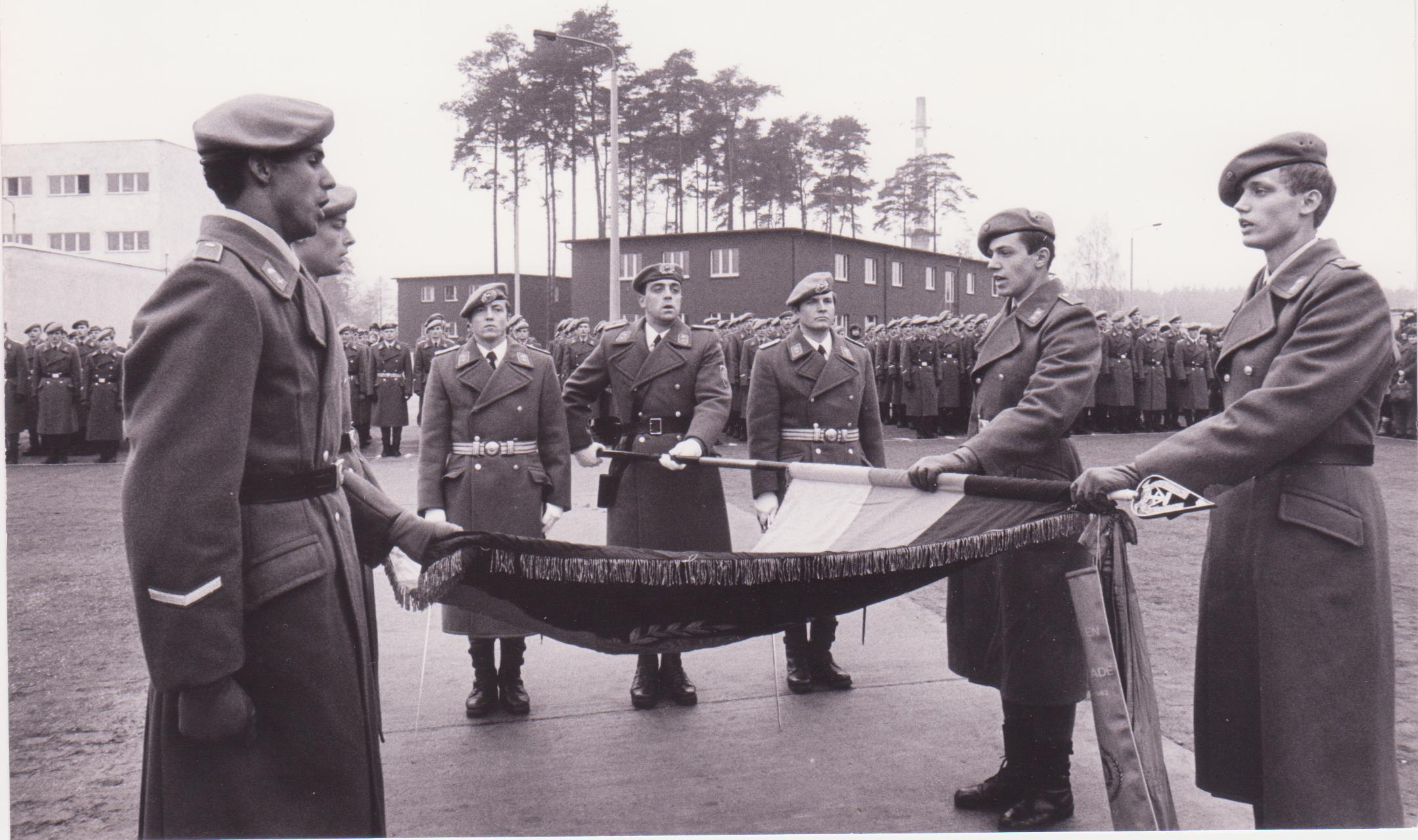
Colors ceremony at the Military Training Area Lenin in Brück, where new soldiers of LStR 40 were sworn in

The LStR-40 was formed on 1 December 1986 under the Order No. 96/86 of the Minister for National Defense and Order No. 30/86 of the Chief of Land Forces. It was stationed in the vicinity of the military training area on Lehnin near Potsdam, Germany. On 3 October 1990, the regiment was taken over by the West German Bundeswehr. On 31 March 1991, it was disbanded by the German Federal Armed Forces Command East.

The unit never saw combat or deployment outside East Germany, except for Warsaw Pact training exercises. The events leading up to the Fall of the Wall saw the only "real" use of the Regiment. Due to the elite nature of the unit and the highly-restrictive selection process, its members were regarded as especially loyal and the unit as a whole was considered "politically reliable" by East German leadership.

As a result of the Monday demonstrations in Leipzig in November 1989, the LStR-40 and other selected units in the 1st Motorized Rifle Division were mobilized for possible deployment into the city. A few days before the announced Monday demonstration, several LStR-40 paratroopers were sent to Leipzig, and housed in local military barracks. This was done at night and under the strictest secrecy. The regiment was to be used to assist the police and special units of the Stasi Department XXII (Counterterrorism) to suppress the popular resistance. Said order to move in against the demonstrators was never given and LStR-40 disbanded in 1991 as the National People's Army was dissolved following the reunification of Germany.

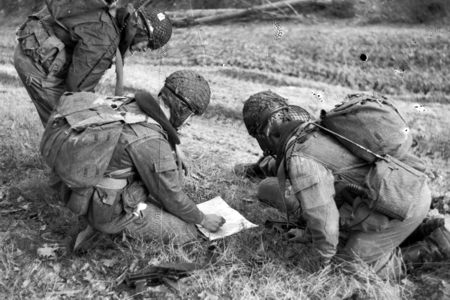
Paratroopers of Luftsturmregiment 40 studying a map during a field exercise.

== Duties ==
Similar to their 40. Fallschirmjägerbataillon Willi Sänger predecessor, the LStR-40 would be tasked to capture important facilities such as airports.

== Training ==
Luftsturmregiment 40 paratroopers were known to be trained in Kyeok Sul Do by North Korean instructors in 1988.

== Equipment ==
=== Uniforms ===
The uniforms of the regiment's paratroopers, like those of all the Land Forces of the NVA, were based on uniforms of the former Wehrmacht, adapted to Soviet uniform and equipment standards. In the early years they wore the field service suit for reconnaissance aircraft of the NVA. It consisted of a hooded jacket and trousers, both in camouflage on a blue-gray tone. Lace-up shoes replaced the usual boots, a leather cap replaced the steel helmet. In later years, the airborne helmet of the Polish paratroopers was introduced, which had earflaps.

=== Weapons ===
In keeping with the airborne and air assault capabilities of the unit, LStR 40 utilized only light weapons, usually standard gear from the main Land Forces of the NVA. Paratrooper-specific variations were used when available.

These included the RPG-7D rocket launcher, which was designed to be separated into two pieces for easier transportation, and the MPi-KMS-72 and MPi-AK-74NK, folding-stock models of the AKM and AK-74 assault rifles respectively.

=== Transport Aircraft ===
To be deployed into combat in the event of war, Luftsturmregiment 40 depended upon the Luftstreitkraefte der NVA to provide it with helicopters for air assault insertions and fixed-wing aircraft for parachute jumps. The regiment trained with the Ilyushin Il-14, the Antonov An-2, Antonov An-8, Antonov An-12, Antonov An-22, Antonov An-26, and the Mil Mi-4 and Mil Mi-8.

The Luftstreitkraefte der NVA did not, however, actually possess enough aircraft or helicopters to move the regiment into combat all at once, meaning that the Soviet Air Force might have had to step in and make up for the shortage in the event of a war with NATO.

=== Parachutes ===
The regiment's last standard model of parachute was the RS 9/2A, with the BE-8 reserve chute. The L-10/2 ST and RL-12/2 ST parachutes were used for HAHO operations. Soldiers of the regiment were trained for HALO jumps as well, but conducted these jumps below the altitude where oxygen equipment would have been needed.
