= Military District V =

- Militärbezirk V
- District colour (Truppenfahne)
- Land Forces of the National People's Army
- Founded: 1. March 1956
- Disbanded: 2. October 1990

Military District V (MB V for short) was a military district of the National People's Army of East Germany. It was created in the northern part of the GDR territory, military-administrative territorial association of units, units and military facilities of various branches of service, special troops and services of the Land Forces of the National People's Army and the (military) substitute system of the NVA.

In the event of mobilization, the 5th Army (NVA) and the Territorial Military District V would have been formed from these formations.

The 5th NVA Army was to form part of the 1st Front of the Group of Soviet Forces in Germany (GSFG).

The strongest massing of the 1st Front would have been in the direction of North German Plain with the 2nd Guards Tank Army and 3. Shock Army on the line Wittenberge, Stendal to Magdeburg and facing the NATO NORTHAG. The operational planning for the deployment of the 5th Army, which was revised in 1983, 1985 and 1988 and had defensive and offensive phases, was the responsibility of the Commander-in-Chief of the 1st Front. At the alert level of full combat readiness, Military District V was led by an army staff and a command from the Territorial Military District.

The planning framework, which in the initial phase assumed aggression by NATO, envisaged bringing their units to a standstill close to the border and going on the offensive from there. In this phase the aim was to overcome enemy barriers and defensive positions and to destroy NATO formations one by one as quickly as possible. The attack speed was assumed to be 50 kilometers per day of combat.

The 5th Army in the North would have been reinforced by the Soviet 94th Guards Motor Rifle Division and the Soviet independent tank regiments 138. and 221. It would have been commanded by the soviet high-command.

It was active from 1 March 1956, to 2 October 1990.

It included Motorized Rifle Troops (mechanized infantry); tank troops; Missile Troops/Artillery; army air defence; Army Aviation Forces; and Special Troops and Services

In 1990, the Chief Military District V / Commander 5th Army was Lieutenant General Horst Sylla; (from 15 September 1990) Major General Manfred Jonischkies; and the Chief of the Territorial MB V (in the state of defence) was to be Major General Henri Thuneman.

The headquarters was located at the Neubrandenburg under the name Command Military District V (Kdo MB V) and included the field command of the 5th Army (NVA) and the leadership of the Territorial Military District.

One armored division (9th Panzer Division) and two motorized infantry divisions (1. motorisierte Schützendivision (1st MSD), and 8th MSD) were assigned to Military District V from the NVA Land Forces. Other associations, troop units, units and facilities were run as an army complex under direct subordination.

== Purpose of Territorial Division ==
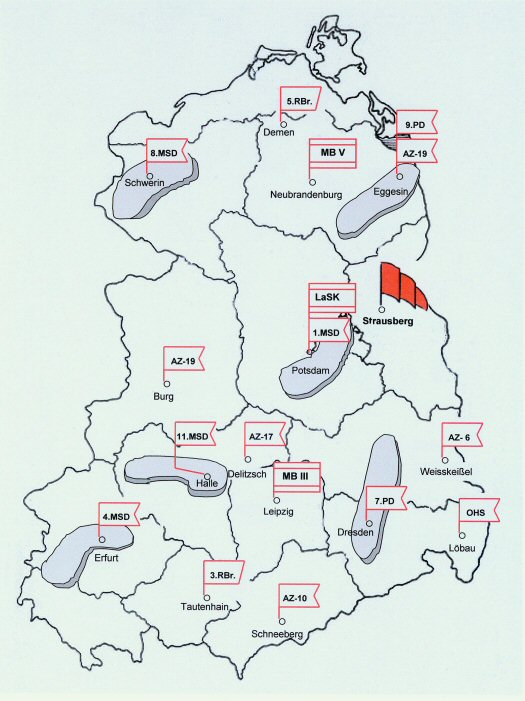
Stationing of the Land Forces of the NVA on the territory of the GDR.

The military-administrative subdivision of the GDR state territory into three geographical areas (Northern, Southern, Berlin area) has served since the early 1950s for the coordinated preparation (planning, organization, command) and implementation of all national defense measures, taking into account the different military-geographical conditions and the requirements of the Soviet armed forces grouping in military-strategic directions.

In the course of the administrative reform of 1952, the competences of the federal states were transferred to the districts of the GDR. The military-administrative responsibilities were already consistently centralized at the republic level and implemented by the territorial administrations of the KVP (North TV-12 and South TV-24). TV Nord (TV 12) was responsible for the GDR districts of Neubrandenburg, Rostock, Schwerin, Potsdam, Frankfurt/Oder and Magdeburg.

Close cooperation between the NVA and the state bodies and local administrations in the territory was crucial to ensure efficient collection of human and material resources in the interests of national defence.

== Order of battle in the 1980s ==
Artist's rendering of a T-34-85 in service with the Landstreitkräfte

1st Motor Rifle Division (Potsdam)

- 1st Motor Rifle Regiment "Hans Beimler"
- 2nd Motor Rifle Regiment "Arthur Ladwig"
- 3rd Motor Rifle Regiment "Paul Hegenbarth"
- 1st Panzer Regiment "Friedrich Wolf"
- 1st Artillery Regiment "Rudolf Gypner"
- 1st AA-Missile Regiment "Anton Fischer"
- 1st Rocket Detachment "Rudi Arndt"
- 1st Heavy Mortar Detachment "Hermann Rentzsch"
- 1st Reconnaissance Battalion "Dr. Richard Sorge"
- 1st Engineer Battalion "Willi Becker"
- 1st Light AT Detachment "Willy Sägebrecht"
- 1st Signal Battalion "Bodo Uhse"
- 1st Logistical Security Battalion "Georg Handke"
- 1st Repair Battalion "Otto Schliwinski"
- 1st Chemical Defence Battalion "Herbert Kittelmann"
- 1st Medical Battalion
- 1st Replacement Regiment

8th Motor Rifle Division (Schwerin)

- 27th Motor Rifle Regiment "Hans Kahle"
- 28th Motor Rifle Regiment "Wilhelm Florin"
- 29th Motor Rifle Regiment "Ernst Moritz Arndt"
- 8th Panzer Regiment "Arthur Becker"
- 8th Artillery Regiment "Erich Mühsam"
- 8th AA-Missile Regiment "Willi Schröder"
- 8th Rocket Detachment "Hermann Schuldt"
- 8th Heavy Mortar Detachment "Mathias Thesen"
- 8th Reconnaissance Battalion "Otto Moritz"
- 8th Engineer Battalion "Tudor Vladimirescu"
- 8th Light AT Detachment "Heinrich Dollwetzel"
- 8th Signal Battalion "Kurt Bürger"
- 8th Logistical Security Battalion "Herbert Tschäpe"
- 8th Repair Battalion "Wilhelm Pieck"
- 8th Chemical Defence Battalion "Erich Correns"
- 8th Medical Battalion "Hans Rodenberg"
- 8th Replacement Regiment

9th Panzer Division (Eggesin)

- 21st Panzer Regiment "Walter Empacher"
- 22nd Panzer Regiment "Soja Kosmodemjanskaja"
- 23rd Panzer Regiment "Julian Marchlewski"
- 9th Motor Rifle Regiment "Rudolf Renner"
- 9th Artillery Regiment "Hans Fischer"
- 9th AA-Missile Regiment "Rudolf Dölling"
- 9th Rocket Detachment "Otto Nuschk"
- 9th Heavy Mortar Detachment "Friedrich Ebert"
- 9th Reconnaissance Battalion "Eduard Claudius"
- 9th Engineer Battalion
- 9th Signal Battalion "Adolf Bytzeck"
- 9th Logistical Security Battalion "Robert Stamm"
- 9th Repair Battalion "Paul Dessau"
- 9th Chemical Defence Battalion "Michael Niederkirchner"
- 9th Medical Battalion "Wolfgang Langhoff"
- 9th Replacement Regiment

== District units in the late 1980s ==
Data is for 1990.

Designation and Abbreviation	Honorific	Location
5th Rocket Brigade (5th RBr)	Bruno Leuschner (26 February 1971)	Stallberg (square), from 1977 Demen (53.630920°N 11.760780°E)
Mobile Rocket Technical Base 5 (BRTB-5)	Carl Moltmann (1 March 1979)	Demen (53.630920°N 11.760780°E)
Artillery Regiment 5 (AR-5)	Paul Sasnowski (1 March 1975)	Stallberg 1956, from 1962 Drögeheide, from 1973 Dabel (53.651410°N 11.879260°E)
Artillery Instrumental Reconnaissance Detachment (IV./AR-5) (Later expanded into a regiment)		(53.651410°N 11.879260°E)
Missile Launcher Section 5 (GeWA-5)		Dabel (53.651410°N 11.879260°E)
Tank Destroyer Abteilung 5 (PJA-5) (Battalion equivalent)	Damdiny Quest-Bator (1 March 1986)	Drögeheide, from 1973 Dabel (53.651410°N 11.879260°E)
5th Anti-Aircraft Missile Regiment (FRR-5)	Bernhard Bästlein (29 February 1978)	Basepohl (53.743370°N 12.945890°E)
Mobile AA Rocket Technical Base 5 (BFRTB-5)	Reinhold Pretzsch (1 March 1983)	Basepohl(53.743370°N 12.945890°E)
Combat Helicopter Geschwader 5 (KHG-5) de:Kampfhubschraubergeschwader 5	Adolf von Lützow (1 March 1980)	Basepohl (53.743370°N 12.945890°E)
Command and Reconnaissance Helicopter Squadron 5 (HGFA-5)		Basepohl (53.743370°N 12.945890°E)
Radio and radio technology reconnaissance battalion 5 (FuFuTAB-5)	(1984–1989) AB-5 Reconnaissance Battalion	Glions (52.902300°N 12.048060°E)
Radio technical battalion 5 (FuTB-5)	Friedrich Dethloff (1 March 1989)	Basepohl (53.743370°N 12.945890°E)
Radio Electronic Combat Battalion 5 (BFEK-5)	Paul Verner (1 March 1989)	Goldberg, Germany (53.583930°N 12.085800°E)
Intelligence Regiment 5 (NR-5)	Horst Jonas (7 October 1969)	Fünfeichen (Neubrandenburg) (53.530670°N 13.284240°E)
Line Construction Regiment 5 (LBR-5)	Bruno Kühn (1 March 1988)	Fünfeichen (Neubrandenburg) (53.530670°N 13.284240°E)
Engineer Regiment 5 (PiR-5)	Horst Viedt (1 July 1967)	Pasewalk (53.494410°N 13.991990°E)
Pontoon Regiment 5 (PoR-5)	Kurt Römling (1 March 1975)	Havelberg (52.838320°N 12.069320°E)
Landing and Transfer Battalion 5 (LÜB-5)	1973–1981, then in the PoR-5	Havelberg (52.838320°N 12.069320°E)
Battalion Chemical Defense 5 (BChA-5)	Erwin Fischer (1 March 1985)	Prenzlau (53.290820°N 13.781450°E)
Detonometry and Reconnaissance Battalion 5 (DetAB-5)	Hermann Schmidt (1 March 1989)	Prenzlau (53.290820°N 13.781450°E)
Guard and Securing Battalion 5 (WSB-5)	Hans-Arno Eckelmann (1 March 1987)	Neubrandenburg (53.530670°N 13.284240°E)
Battalion Material Securing 5 (BMS-5)		Pasewalk (53.494410°N 13.991990°E)
Repair Battalion 5 (IB-5)		Relzow (53.887540°N 13.708890°E)
