= Kommando Landstreitkräfte =

Coordinates: 52°23′10.6″N 12°58′15.7″E

Land Forces Command (Kdo LaSK)
- Kommando Landstreitkräfte — XXXX —
- Troop Colours of the National People's Army
- Active: 1 December 1972 – 2 October 1990
- Disbanded: 2 October 1990
- Country: East Germany
- Allegiance: National Defense Council
- Branch: Land Forces of the National People's Army
- Type: Formation
- Role: Army Command
- Size: c. 800 military people and 200 civilians
- Part of: Ministry of National Defence
- Garrison/HQ: Geltow

Insignia
- Vehicle Insignia

Structure of the GDR National People's Army Land Forces, as to December 1, 1986.

The Kommando Landstreitkräfte (short: Kdo LaSK or Kommando LaSK) was the Army staff — and simultaneously the Army command of the National People's Army (NPA) Land Forces of the former GDR.

== History ==
On 1 December 1972 the Kommando LaSK was established under the command of LG Horst Stechbarth as independent Army Staff, and Main Army Command of the Land Forces, a military branch of the GDR National People's Army. As HQ served the former barracks of the Oberkommando der Luftwaffe, built by Ernst Sagebiel in 1936, and located in the area of the Wildpark Potsdam.

It was disbanded together with the NPA in 1990. The legal successor became the Bundeswehrkommando Ost under LG Jörg Schönbohm. Today the "Einsatzführungskommando of the Bundeswehr" is stationed in this Barracks.

== Command and Organization ==
=== Command, Control, and Communications ===
The main task of the NPA Army Command was to provide Command, Control and Communications (C3) to the military branch as the whole, as well as to the subordinated corps-sized commands, officer's high schools, groups, organizations, and units of the NPA's Land Forces.

Under deployment conditions, and in line with the situation awareness C3 had to be executed from the Component Headquarters in Geltow, Field Component Headquarters or Operations Centers.

=== Commanding generals of the NPA Army Command ===
No.	Portrait	Name	Took office	Left office	Time in office
1	Horst Stechbarth	Colonel general Horst Stechbarth (1925–2016)	1 December 1972	31 December 1989	17 years, 30 days
2	Horst Skerra [de]	Lieutenant general Horst Skerra (born 1930)	1 January 1990	14 September 1990	256 days
3	Hans-Christian Reiche [de]	Major general Hans-Christian Reiche (born 1944)	15 September 1990	2 October 1990	17 days

Remark

The commanding general was competent, mandated and authorized to provide tasks and orders direct to the subordinated deputies. He was assisted by a so-called Militärrat of the Army Command, the highest HQ advisory body on deputy level.

=== Organization ===
The command was composed by the following establishment:

Deputy Minister and Commander-in-chief Army (3 star level) with the military advisor

Deputy of the Commander Army Command (DC Army Command) and Chief of the Political Division (2 star level) with

- Three branches including Chief Party Control Commission (de: PKK), Central Party Leadership (de: ZPL), Spec-Propaganda, and Political Branch of the Kdo LSK/LV

DC Army Command and Chief of Staff (CS) (2 star level) with

- Assistant Chief Of Staff (ACOS) and G3 (1 star level) with

- Branch 1
- Branch 2

- ACOS and Chief General Tasks with

- Staff company, guard company and vehicle company

- Chief G1 with PTA and WTA
- Chief Organization/Replenishment with

- Branch Organization
- Branch Replenishment

- Chief RECON

- Chief General-Military Training and Schools (de: AMAS)

- Chief G6 with

- Branches 1, 2 and 8th section

- Chief Mil Scientific (de: MiWi)

- Chief Chemical Services (de: CD)

DC Army and Chief G4 (de. RD) (2 star level) with
- AC and CS G4 (1 Star level)
- Chief Medical Service
- Chief Combat Engineer Service
- Chief Military Architecture Accommodation (de: MBU)
- Chief Military Transport (de: MTW)
- Chief Closing and Equipment (de: BA)

Chief SAM Forces (de. FRT)
Chief Army Aviation
Military prosecutor
Division 2000
- Here the branch G2 with responsibility to the military branch Land Forces of the National People's Army

=== Furthermore generals of the NPA Army Command ===
Name	Military rank	Position	Remark
Engelhardt, Lothar	Major general	Chief RECON; DC Army Command and Chief of Staff	last Chief of the NPA
Großer, Roland	Major general	DC Army Command and Chief Missile corps and Artillery; DC Army Command and Chief of Staff	
Handke, Heiny	Lieutenant general	DC Army Command on Training; DC Army Command and Chief of Staff	
Winter, Werner	Major general	DC Army Command on Training	

== Subordinated commands, forces, units, and organizations ==
The following units and commands reported directly to NPA Land Forces Command:

- Military District Command III (de: Kommando Militärbezirk III, Kdo. MB-III) with headquarters
- Military District V with headquarters at Neubrandenburg
- 40th Artillery Brigade (de: 40. Artilleriebrigade, 40. ABr) (Blankenfelde)
- 40th Technical Training Center (de: Ausbildungs-Technisches Zentrum 40, ATZ-40)
- 40th Parachute Training Base (de: Fallschirmjägerausbildungsbasis, FJABas-40)
- Air defence missile training center 40 (de: Fla-Raketenausbildungszentrum 40, FRAZ-40)
- 40th Multiple rocket launcher battalion (de: Geschoßwerferabteilung 40, GeWA-40)
- 40th Construction engineering battalion (de: Ingenieurbaubataillon 40, IBB-40)
- Luftsturmregiment 40
- Miltaty technical school of the Land forces "Erich Habersaath"
- 40th Signal battalion (de: Nachrichtenbataillon 40, NB-40)
- Land forces Officer Cadet School "Ernst Thälmann"
- Foreign Military Officers Training School (de: Offiziershochschule für ausländische Militärkader "Otto Winzer")
- Engineer construction battalion 40 (de: Pionierbaubataillon 40, PiBB-40)
- 40th center for missile forces training (de: Raketenausbildungszentrum 40, RAZ-40)
- 40th Support and Garrison Battalion (de: Wach- und Sicherstellungsbataillon 40, WSB-40)
