= Paetz =

Paetz is a surname. Notable people with the surname include:

- David Paetz (born 1940), New Zealand cricketer
- Emma Paetz, Canadian actress
- Juliusz Paetz (1935–2019), Polish bishop of the Catholic Church
- Rolf Paetz (1922–1994), German footballer
- Sabine Paetz (née Möbius, second married name John, born 1957), East German heptathlete

== See also ==
- Patz
