= 40. Fallschirmjägerbataillon Willi Sänger =

East German Airborne battalion

- Active: 1962-1986
- Country: East Germany
- Branch: Land Forces of the National People's Army
- Type: Commando
- Role: Airborne forces Air assault Special forces
- Size: Battalion
- Part of: Kommando Landstreitkräfte
- Garrison/HQ: Prora, Rügen island (1962–82); Potsdam (1982–90)
- Colors: Orange
- Battle honours: Willi Sänger

The 40. Fallschirmjägerbataillon Willi Sänger (English: 40th Parachute Light Infantry Battalion) was the only airborne forces unit formation of the National People's Army, formed in 1962. The battalion was based in Prora on Rügen island (1962–82) and later near Potsdam (1982–90). Numerous military observers had considered the unit to be one of the most professional forces in the Warsaw Pact despite its small size.

In German-language media, they were known as commandos instead of paratroopers.

== History ==
In March 1960, four years after the founding of the East German Army, the first paratrooper unit was formed from the 5th Motorized Rifle Battalion (German: Motorschützenbataillons 5). On 28 February 1962, it was renamed as the 5th Paratrooper Battalion (German: Fallschirmjägerbataillon 5). The Number 5 identified the affiliation with the 5th Military District with headquarters in Neubrandenburg. On February 28, 1963, the 5th Paratrooper Battalion's flag was handed back to Major General Hans Bleck in a ceremony.

The unit was seen in public for the first time on the occasion of the 1964 May Day parade in East Berlin.

On 23 September 1969, the battalion was bestowed with the tradition-based name of "Willi Sänger", an anti-Nazi resistance fighter and workers' sports devotee. From December 1, 1969, the battalion was placed under the command of the Training Administration of the Ministry of National Defense.

In 1971, the battalion was renamed as the 2nd Paratrooper Battalion (German: Fallschirmjägerbataillon 2) and then on 8 November 1972, it was renamed as the 40th Paratrooper Battalion, under the direct command of the Kommando Landstreitkräfte, based in Potsdam. In 1973, an airborne company was expanded at Cottbus.

Starting in 1981, a company of paratroopers from the Battalion began guarding the headquarters of the East German Defence Ministry in Strausberg.

On 1 December 1986, the unit was expanded to form the Luftsturmregiment 40 (English: 40th Air Assault Regiment) under the Order No. 96/86 of the Minister for National Defence and Order No. 30/86 of the Chief of Land Forces.

After the unit was disbanded, surviving members joined an association known as Fallschirmjäger-Traditionsverband Ost e.V.

== Duties ==
In time of war, the battalion would be used as a commando strike unit to infiltrate and sabotage NATO command structures and supply routes. The unit was placed under direct command from the East German Defense Ministry.

Paratroopers were to be employed to eliminate nuclear weapons carriers and enemy command posts, to prevent the resupply of enemy forces, or to occupy important objects until conventional forces arrived. This would sometimes be done while masquerading as NATO troops.

== Organization ==
The 40. Fallschirmjägerbataillon was modeled after the "Rejdoviki," the Soviet special-purpose paratrooper units which were intended to be used for commando operations and for subversion and long-range reconnaissance missions. The unit consisted of 400 to 500 paratroopers.

The basic structure of the Battalion was five Parachute Companies, a Signal Company, and a Sapper Company. In combat, the companies of the battalion were to be split up into five or six-man teams to lower its operational profile.

The battalion had paratroopers who were also trained for diving operations.

=== Training ===
All of the battalion's personnel were volunteers who had to pass many selective tests before being channeled for further training. Every year a few hundred young NVA soldiers volunteered for a place in the unit, but only 8–10% passed.

The following basic prerequisites were necessary:

- Completion of the tenth grade of the general education-providing polytechnical advanced school.
- At least twelve parachute jumps in the Society for Sport and Technology.
- Proof of physical performance passing an "Eight-Event Test."

Since this unit required a long-term commitment, the service period of a paratrooper was generally at least 3 years.

Training took place in the unit in accordance with the requirements of commando operations similar to US Army Rangers and Special Forces. Training was as rigorous as possible, with physical combat and weapons drills to the point of complete exhaustion and the most rigorous kind of athletic training. At the same time, paratroopers were instilled with a marked consciousness of belonging to an elite fighting unit.

The training was tailored particularly for employment in the enemy's rear area. It was intended to produce a brave, strong, persevering, and independent-thinking fighter.

Special training included the following:

- Daytime and night-time combat training.
- Day-time and night-time parachute jumping under the most difficult terrain and weather conditions.
- Handling of explosive and incendiary devices.
- Mountain climbing, skiing, swimming, and diving.
- Military physical training with 15-kilometer runs and interval training.
- Forced marches while wearing protective masks and 100-km marches with a complete set of equipment.
- Close-combat training.
- Radio operations.
- Urban Combat operations.
- Marksmanship training.
- Survival training.
- Foreign languages.

The training of non-commissioned officers took place during the first one year of their service period at a non-commissioned officer school for the career category "Noncommissioned Officers for Motorized Infantry Units," after which they performed their duties in their unit for the first time.

Prior to their assignment to the unit, officers received their normal officer training in the "Commanders of Motorized Infantry Units" section of the "Ernst Thaelmann" Officer Academy for the ground forces in Loebau/Zittau and then they get their additional special training in the unit.

=== Equipment ===
The battalion used the same 'raindrop' camouflage as regular NVA ground troops. The jump uniform made for the paratroopers had knitted cuffs on the wrists, ankles, and neck.

There was specialised equipment items such as the large rucksack, paratrooper knife, combat vest with pouch for a respirator and NBC kit, rain coat, laced ankle boots, and M1956 paratrooper helmets. The paratroopers' arm-of-service color was orange, which was displayed on their collar and shoulder boards.

40. Fallschirmjägerbataillon paratroopers used orange berets (Baskenmutze) in parades and other public events, but they used gray berets when in the field. The selection of orange berets was symbolic, to commemorate the German Peasants' War.

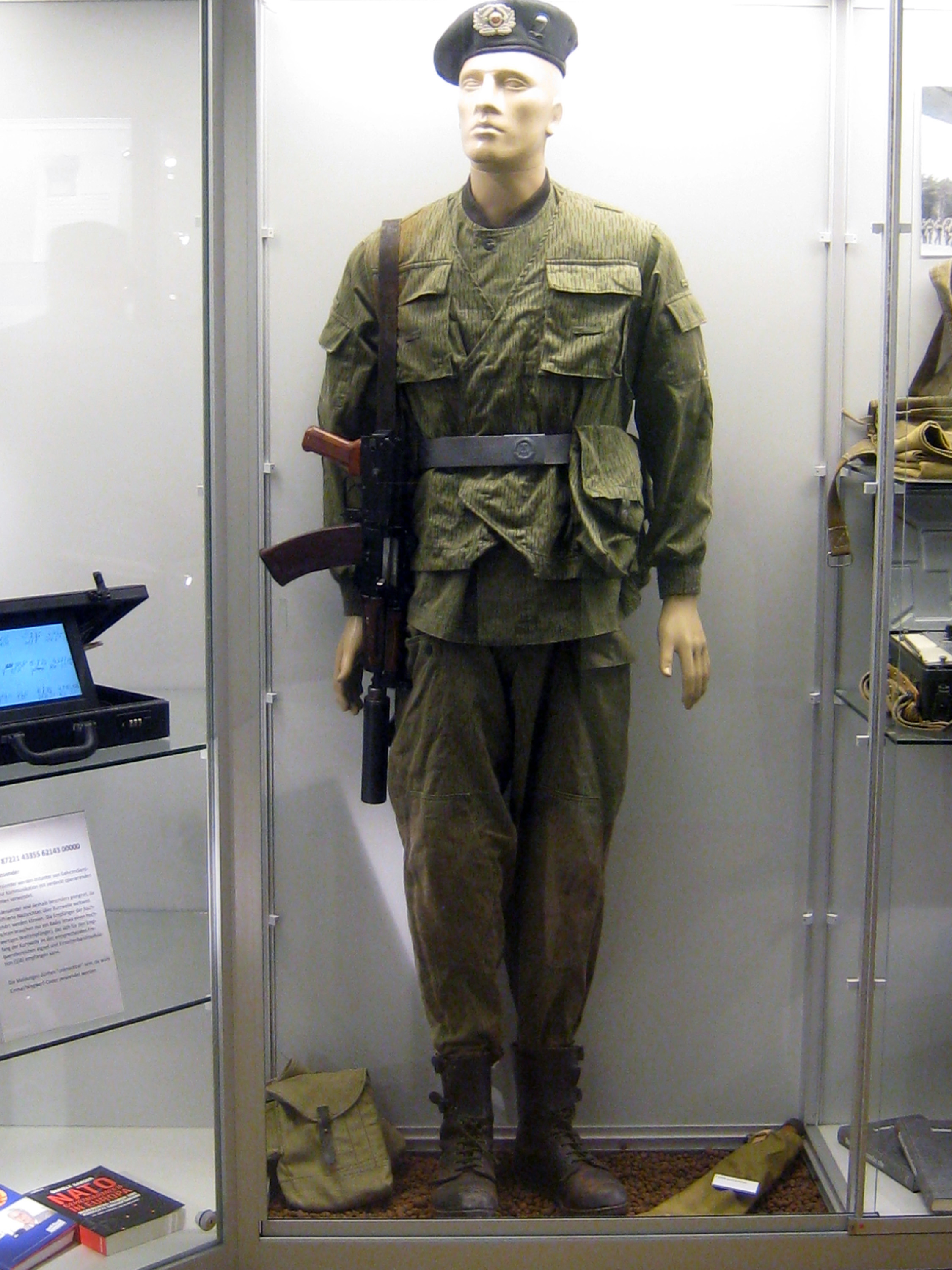
NVA Fallschirmjäger uniform.

The paratroopers used practically the same weapons as the rest of the Land force:

- Makarov PM semi-automatic pistol
- AK-74 assault rifle
- RPD light machine gun
- PKM General-purpose machine gun
- Dragunov SVD semi-automatic sniper rifle
- RPG-7D light AT-weapon specially made for airborne use
- 9K32 Strela-2
