= Hermann Rentzsch (general) =

- Born: 27 May 1913; Schmiedeberg (Ore Mountains), Germany
- Died: 12 April 1978 (aged 64) East Berlin, East Germany
- Allegiance: (Nazi Germany) Third Reich (German Empire) NKFD (1943 to 1945) (East Germany) GDR
- Service years: 1934 Reichswehr; 1935-1943 Wehrmacht; 1956–1959 NPA
- Rank: Generalmajor
- Awards

Hermann Rentzsch (27 May 1913 – 12 April 1978) was a Major General of the People's Police and the National People's Army in the German Democratic Republic (GDR). Later he served as Deputy Minister for heavy machinery and equipment of the GDR.

== Life ==
Rentzsch was born in Schmiedeberg, Germany and worked as a carpenter. Between 1927 and 1933 he was a member of the Socialist Working Youth. He became a soldier in the German Reichswehr in 1934, serving in a Nebelwerfer-Abteilung and was promoted to sergeant. During the Second World War he was nominated for an officer's career. Rentzsch became a lieutenant in 1940 and a first lieutenant in 1942. He was captured at Stalingrad in 1943 and taken into Soviet captivity. He became a member of the National Committee for a Free Germany and worked as a front organization representative of the Soviet 6th Guards Army engaged in propaganda work. According to the memoirs of Marshal Ivan Bagramyan, his German anti-fascists activities were instrumental in organizing the Battle of Königsberg.

He became a member of the German Communist Party in July 1945 after attending a short course at the anti-fascist school in Rüdersdorf. In 1946 he became a member of Socialist Unity Party (SED). Rentzsch served as the mayor of the city of Stollberg/Ore Mountains from 1945 to 1947 and from 1947 to 1948 he was the chief administrator of the district Stollberg.

In 1948, Rentzsch was involved as one of the early leaders in the development of the Kasernierte Volkspolizei (Barracked People's Police), the nucleus for the National People’s Army. In 1948/49 he was the Chief Inspector and head of the border alert police of the German Administration of the Interior. After appropriate further military training in the Soviet Union from 1949 to 1950, he became a Major General of the People's Police in 1952. He served as commander of the Territorial Department North. After the founding of the National People's Army, he was commander of the Military District V. In 1957 he was Director of Training at the Ministry of National Defense. In 1959 he was the Director of Administration at the headquarters of the National People’s Army Artillery.

In 1959, the German Democratic Republic started dismissing former Wehrmacht soldiers from active duty and Rentzsch was transferred in the reserves. He became principal director of the state owned industry UNIMAK (Universalmaschinen Koppatsch) which coordinated all armament industries. He was thus responsible for oversight of various munitions factories and chemical plants. Between 1961 and 1965 he was Deputy Chairman of the Economic Council of the GDR and 1966/67 Deputy Minister of heavy machinery and plant construction. Between 1967 and 1972, Rentzsch was the first Director of Administration for Defense Economics to the chairman of the Council of Ministers. Finally, from 1972 to 1976 he was deputy chief of weapons and equipment at the Ministry of National Defense.

== Awards and honors ==
- 1943 German Cross in Gold
- 1963 Banner of Laborold (de: Orden Banner der Arbeit)
- 1973 Patriotic Order of Merit - Gold, 1st class (de: Vaterländischer Verdienstorden - Gold)
- 1976 Scharnhorst Order (de: Scharnhorst Orden)
- GDR Combat order "Of Merit for the Nation and Fatherland" - Silver, 2nd class (de: Kampforden "Für Verdienste um Volk und Vaterland" der DDR - Silber.)
- 1987, 1st MLRS-Battalion (1st MID) received the honorable name “Hermann Rentzsch”
