= Willi Sänger =

German Communist and resistance fighter against the Nazis (1894–1944)

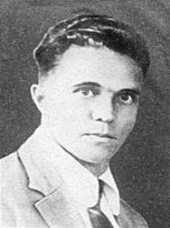
Willi Sänger

Heinrich Max Willi Sänger (German pronunciation: [ˈvɪli ˈzɛŋɐ]; 21 May 1894 in Berlin, Germany – 27 November 1944 in Brandenburg, Germany) was a German Communist and resistance fighter against the Nazis.

== Life ==
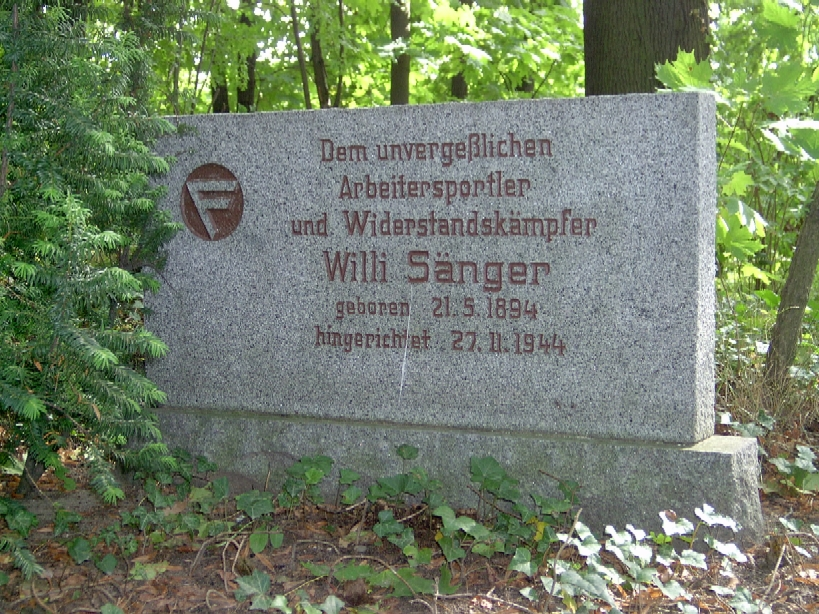
Memorial for Willi Sänger in the Zentralfriedhof Friedrichsfelde in Berlin, Germany

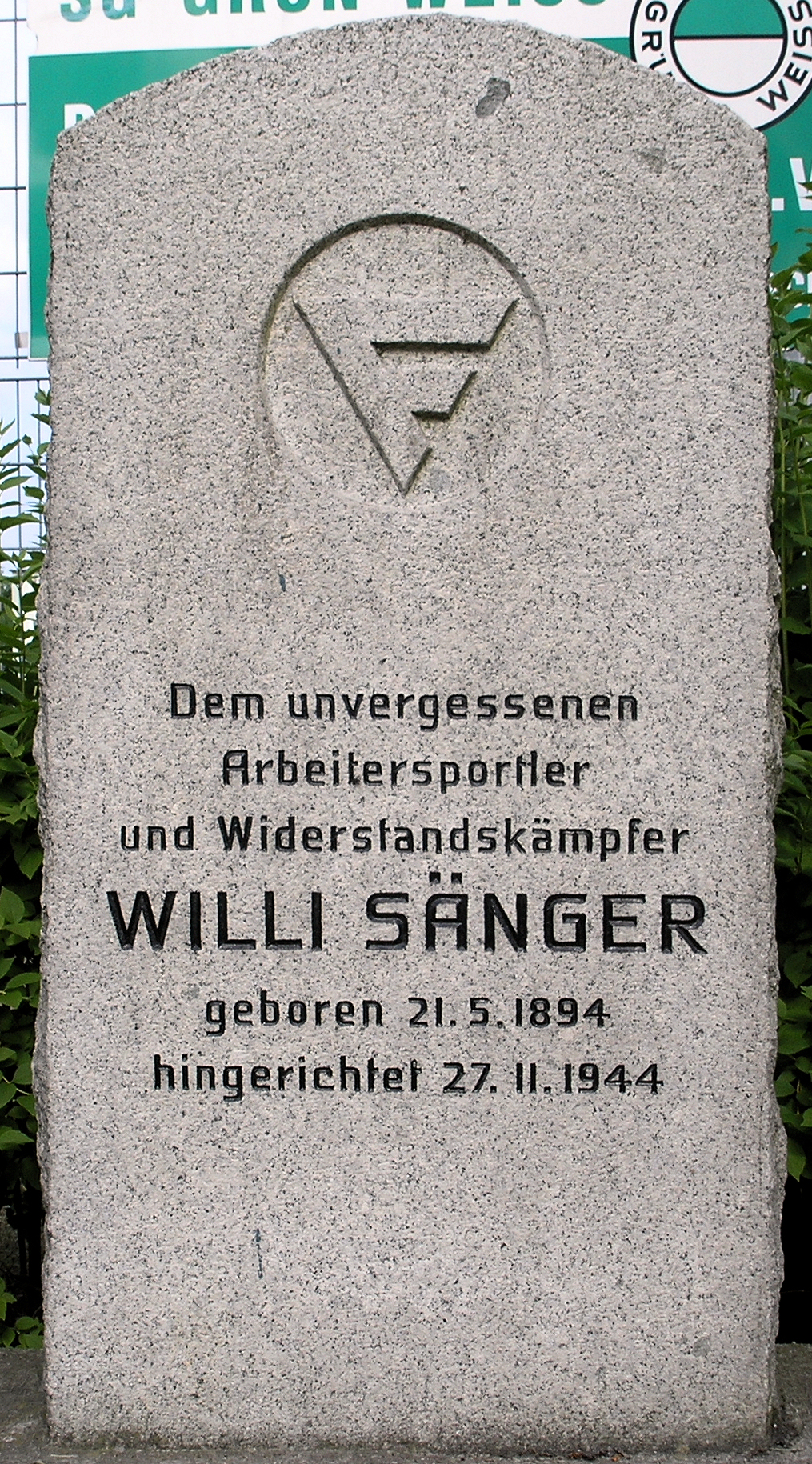
Memorial stone, Willi Sänger, Köpenicker Landstraße 186, Berlin-Plänterwald, Germany

Willi Sänger, was the son of a carpenter. After school, he completed a commercial apprenticeship. His occupation was a clerk and before World War I he joined the labor movement. During the war he served as a soldier in the German Army. He became a member of the Sozialdemokratische Partei Deutschlands (SPD) in 1912 at the age of 18. Because of his moderate stance on the war, he changed party membership in 1917 first to the Unabhängige Sozialdemokratische Partei Deutschlands (USPD), and eventually joined the Communist Party of Germany (KPD) in 1919.

He was an avid athlete and participated as a high jumper taking part in international competitions. He founded the Division of Workers Sports Athletics Association "Fichte“ (Spruce). Later he took over the presidency of the Fichte-sports community in Berlin-Southeast and in 1928, led the Kampfgemeinschaft für Rote Sporteinheit "struggle unit for red sports unity". As leader of the red sports association he was responsible for the forerunner of the later Society for Sports and Technology / Gesellschaft für Sport und Technik (GST) in East Germany.

In 1933, Willi Sänger worked as an accountant at the Soviet travel agency "Intourist" and oversaw a working library.

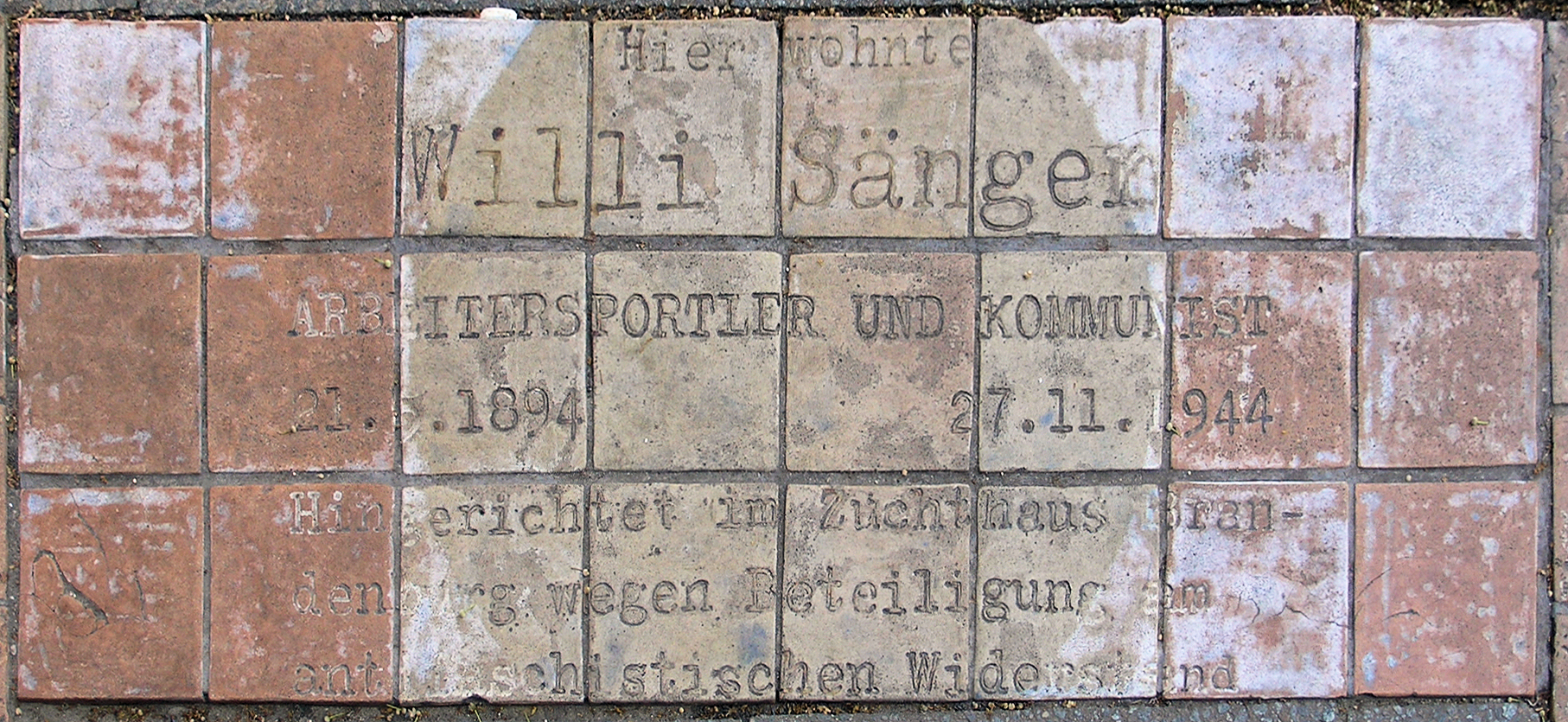
Memorial plaque, Willi Sänger, Oppelner Straße 45, Berlin-Kreuzberg, Germany

During World War II, Willi Sänger worked extensively as an illegal labor functionary of the Communist Party. On behalf of the KPD leadership he put together reports indicating the political mood of the population. From about 1938, Willi Sänger was a member of Robert Uhrig's resistance group. After their defeat in 1942, he joined the largest opposition group in the KPD with Anton Saefkow, Franz Jacob and Bernhard Bästlein. There he worked mainly as liaison to the Leipzig Schumann–Engert–Kresse Group of Georg Schumann. From the government printing office he purchased the Gestapo’s "German wanted list". This allowed some anti-Nazis to be notified and saved from arrest and death.

The Saefkow Jacob Bästlein organization was betrayed by an informer in early July 1944, and Willi Sänger was arrested on 6 July 1944. On 21 October 1944, he was sentenced to death by beheading by the People's Court. His execution was carried out on 27 November 1944 at the Brandenburg-Görden Prison. He is buried in the central cemetery / Zentralfriedhof Friedrichsfelde in Berlin.

== Honors ==
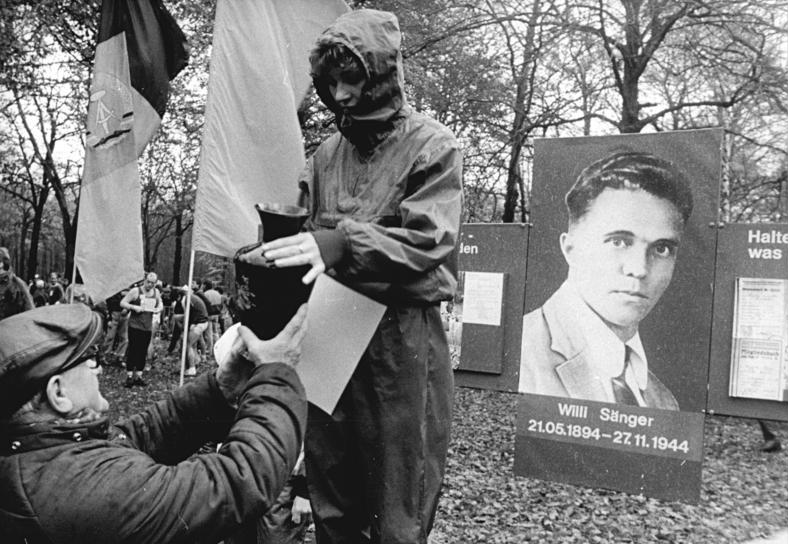
Ellen Kiessling, winner of the 33rd Willi Sänger commemorative run in 1988

Willi Sänger resistance to National Socialism is memorialized in the Socialist Central Cemetery Friedrichsfelde in Berlin's Lichtenberg district.

At his former home in the Opole Straße 45 in Berlin there is sidewalk plaque commemorating him.

The East Germany National People's Army gave their 40th Airborne Battalion the honor name of "Willi Sänger" on 23 September 1969.

Sänger was a Socialist hero in East Germany and several streets, schools, sports teams, etc. were named in his honor.
