= Bredenfelde =

- Municipality
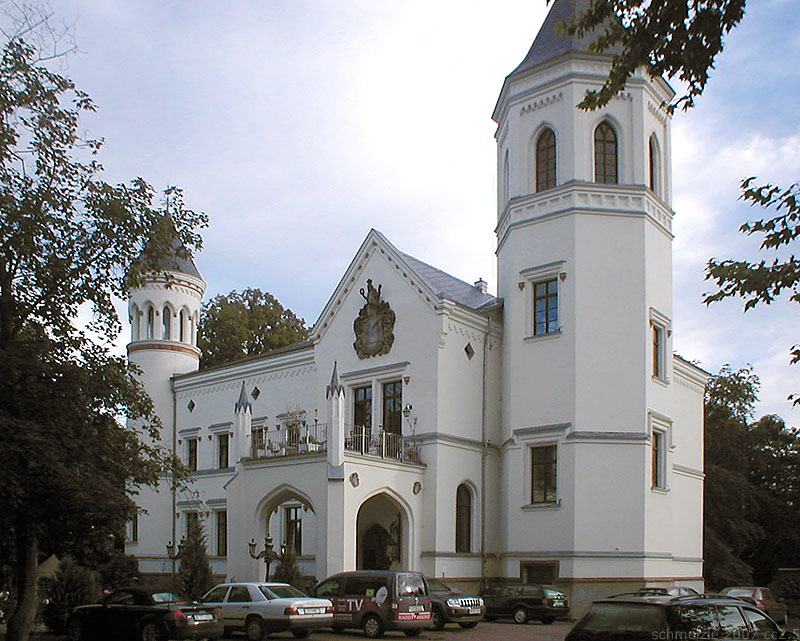
- Bredenfelde Castle / Manor House

- Location of Bredenfelde within Mecklenburgische Seenplatte district
- Interactive map of Bredenfelde
- Location within Germany Location within Mecklenburg-Vorpommern
- Coordinates: 53°36′N 12°57′E
- Country: Germany
- State: Mecklenburg-Vorpommern
- District: Mecklenburgische Seenplatte
- Municipal assoc.: Stavenhagen

Government
  - Mayor: Wolfgang Neumann

Area
  - Total: 8.58 km^{2} (3.31 sq mi)
- Elevation: 59 m (194 ft)

Population (2025-12-31)
  - Total: 173
  - Density: 20.2/km^{2} (52.2/sq mi)
- Time zone: UTC+01:00 (CET)
  - Summer (DST): UTC+02:00 (CEST)
- Postal codes: 17153
- Dialling codes: 039955
- Vehicle registration: DM

Bredenfelde is a municipality in the Mecklenburgische Seenplatte district, in Mecklenburg-Vorpommern, Germany.
