= Eduard Claudius =

German writer and diplomat

Eduard Claudius in 1955

Eduard Claudius (born Schmidt; 29 July 1919 – 13 December 1976) was a German writer and diplomat.

== Biography ==
Eduard Claudius was born as Eduard Schmidt in the family of a construction worker. From 1925 to 1927 he completed an apprenticeship as a bricklayer and then worked in this profession. From 1927 he became involved in trade union work and became trade union treasurer and workers' correspondent for the Communist Party newspaper Ruhr-Echo. From 1929 to 1932 he traveled to Austria, Switzerland, Italy, France and Spain. In 1932 he became a member of the KPD. After the Nazi seizure of power, he was arrested in 1933 but was released. In 1934 he emigrated to Switzerland, where he was active in the anti-fascist resistance. In Switzerland he came into contact with Hans Marchwitza, who supported his literary attempts. In 1936 he was arrested by the Swiss authorities; he escaped the threat of extradition to the German Reich by fleeing to Spain.

As a member of the International Brigades, Claudius was one of the first to take part in the Spanish Civil War on the Republican side as a foreign volunteer. After being wounded, he worked as a cultural and war commissar. Towards the end of the civil war, he was interned in France in 1938 from there he managed to escape to Switzerland in 1939. Because he was staying in the country illegally, he was arrested again and had to spend the years from 1939 to 1945 as an internee in various Swiss labor camps. Here he began his novel Green Olives and Naked Mountains, which is set in Spain. The threat of deportation to the German Reich was prevented by interventions by the authors Hermann Hesse and Albert Ehrenstein. At the beginning of 1945 Claudius joined the Italian Garibaldi partisan brigade.

In July 1945 he returned to Germany and from 1945 to 1947 he was press chief of the Bavarian Ministry for Denazification. In the GDR, Claudius worked as a freelance writer until 1956. From 1956 onwards, he was a member of the GDR's diplomatic service. From 1956 to 1959, he served as Consul General in Syria, and from 1959 to 1961, he was the GDR's ambassador to North Vietnam.

Claudius was a member of the Writers' Union of the GDR and its first secretary from 1955 to 1957. From 1965 he was a member of the German Academy of Arts in East Berlin, and from 1967 to 1969 he was its vice president. From 1963 to 1967 he was a member of the district council for the Potsdam district.

On December 13, 1976, he died in Potsdam after returning from a trip.

== Works ==
Claudius' literary work consists of novels, short stories, reports, memoirs, travelogues and dramas. He became known through the autobiographical novel about the Spanish Civil War: Green Olives and Naked Mountains. His novel People at Our Side, which is about a socialist activist, published in 1951 was praised by the literary critics of the GDR as a prime example of a work of the socialist realism demanded by the state.

- Jugend im Umbruch, Basel 1936 (under the pseudonym Edy Brendt)
- Grüne Oliven und nackte Berge, Zürich 1945
- Haß, Berlin 1947
- Gewitter, Potsdam 1948
- Notizen nebenbei, Berlin 1948
- Salz der Erde, Berlin 1948
- Vom schweren Anfang, Berlin 1950 (als Hörspiel 1969)
- Zu Anbeginn, Berlin 1950
- Erzählungen, Berlin 1951
- Menschen an unserer Seite, Berlin 1951
- Früchte der harten Zeit, Berlin 1953
- Seemannsgarn neu gesponnen, Berlin 1954
- Paradies ohne Seligkeit, Berlin 1955
- Von der Liebe soll man nicht nur sprechen, Berlin 1957
- Als die Fische die Sterne schluckten, Berlin 1961
- Die Nacht des Käuzchens und andere Erzählungen, Berlin 1961
- Das Mädchen Sanfte Wolke, Berlin 1962
- Aus den nahen und den fernen Städten, Berlin 1964
- Wintermärchen auf Rügen, Halle (Saale) 1965
- Geheimnis der Tapferen, Berlin 1967
- Der Sergeant und der Prinz, Berlin 1967
- Ruhelose Jahre, Halle (Saale) 1968
- Mit Netz und Winsch auf hoher See, Halle (Saale) 1973
- Hochzeit in den Alawitenbergen, Halle/Saale 1975
- Syrien, Halle/Saale 1975
- Die Heimat ist weit, Berlin 1976
- Geschichte einer Liebe, Halle [u. a.] 1982
