= Patz =

Patz or Pätz is a surname. Notable people with the surname include:

- Alina Pätz (born 1990), Swiss curler
- Arnall Patz (1920–2010), American medical doctor
- Claudio Pätz (born 1987), Swiss curler
- Etan Patz (1972–1979), murdered American child
- Flemming Patz (born 1967), Swedish curler and coach
- Johannes Patz (born 1993), Swedish curler
- Jonathan Patz, American medical professor
