= National People's Army =

Armed forces of East Germany (1956–1990)

- Nationale Volksarmee
- Emblem

- Flag
- Motto: Für den Schutz der Arbeiter-und-Bauern-Macht (For the protection of the workers' and peasants' power)
- Founded: 1 March 1956
- Disbanded: 2 October 1990
- Service branches: Landstreitkräfte; Volksmarine; Luftstreitkräfte; Grenztruppen (1961–1971)
- Headquarters: Strausberg, Bezirk Frankfurt

Leadership
- Commander-in-chief: See list: Walter Ulbricht; Erich Honecker; Egon Krenz; Manfred Gerlach; Sabine Bergmann-Pohl
- Minister of Defence: See list: Willi Stoph; Heinz Hoffmann; Heinz Kessler; Theodor Hoffmann; Rainer Eppelmann
- Chief of Staff: See list: Vincenz Müller; Heinz Hoffmann; Sigfrid Riedel; Heinz Kessler; Fritz Streletz; Manfred Grätz

Personnel
- Conscription: Yes
- Active personnel: 176,000
- Reserve personnel: 47,000

Industry
- Foreign suppliers: Czechoslovakia; Soviet Union

Related articles
- History: Cold War
- Ranks: Military ranks of East Germany

The National People's Army (German: Nationale Volksarmee, pronounced [natsi̯oˈnaːlə ˈfɔlksʔaʁˌmeː]; NVA [ɛn faʊ ˈʔaː]) were the armed forces of the German Democratic Republic (GDR) from 1956 until 1990.

The NVA was organized into four branches: the Landstreitkräfte (Ground Forces), the Volksmarine (Navy), the Luftstreitkräfte (Air Force) and the Grenztruppen (Border Troops). The NVA belonged to the Ministry of National Defence and was commanded by the Nationaler Verteidigungsrat (National Defence Council), which were headquartered in Strausberg - 30 kilometers (19 mi) east of East Berlin. From 1962, conscription was mandatory for all DDR males aged between 18 and 60 requiring an 18-month service, and it was the only Warsaw Pact military to offer non-combat roles to conscientious objectors, known as "construction soldiers" (Bausoldat). The NVA reached 175,300 personnel at its peak in 1987.

The NVA was formed on 1 March 1956 to succeed the Kasernierte Volkspolizei (Barracked People's Police) and under the influence of the Soviet Army became one of the Warsaw Pact militaries opposing NATO during the Cold War. The majority of NATO officers rated the NVA the best military in the Warsaw Pact based on discipline, thoroughness of training, and quality of officer leadership. The NVA did not see significant combat but participated in the Warsaw Pact invasion of Czechoslovakia in 1968, deployed military advisors to other Communist states, and manned the Berlin Wall, where they were responsible for numerous deaths.

The NVA was dissolved on 2 October 1990 with the DDR before German reunification, and its facilities and equipment were handed over to the Bundeswehr (the armed forces of West Germany), which also absorbed most of its personnel below the rank of non-commissioned officer.

== History ==
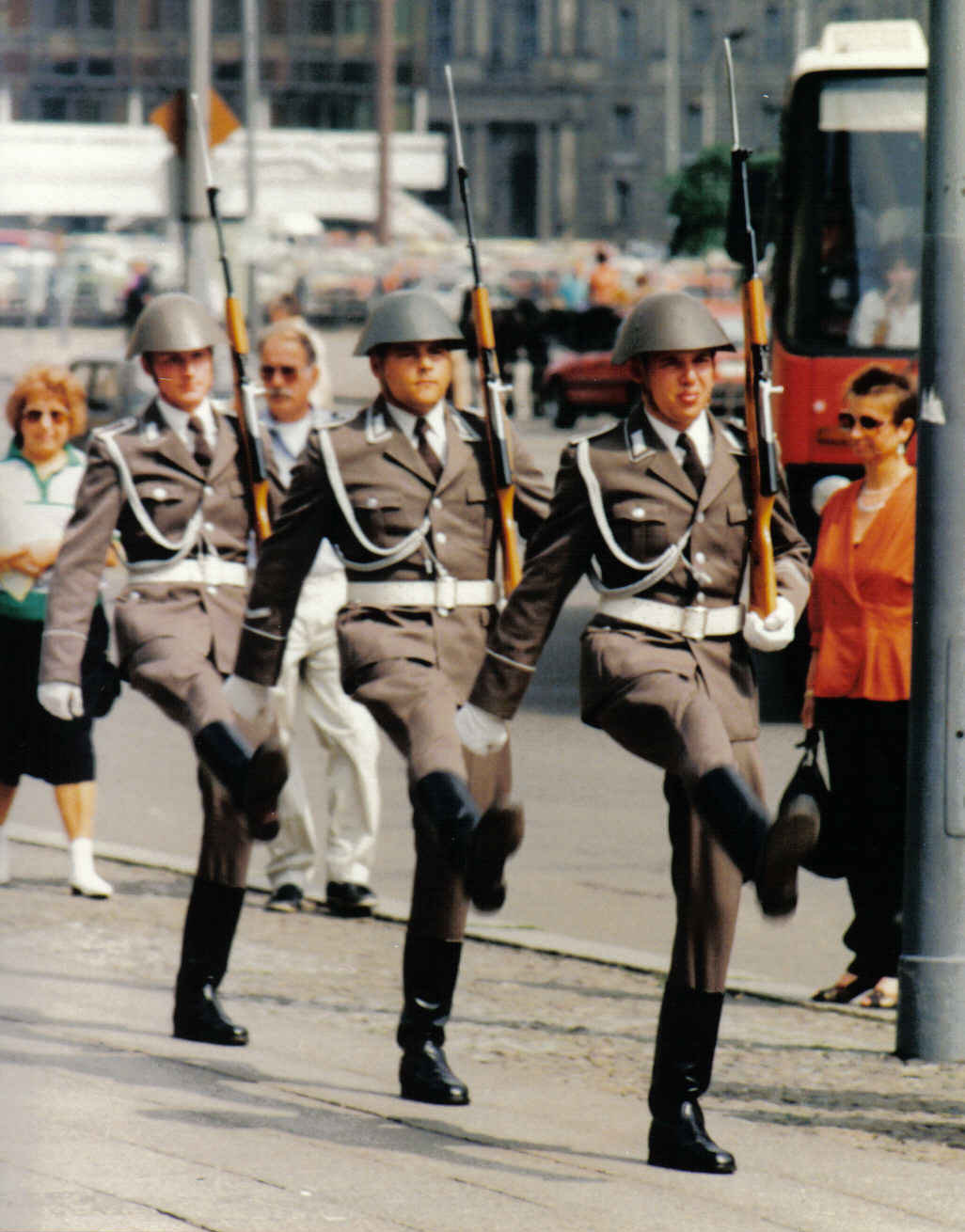
Soldiers of the Guard Regiment Friedrich Engels marching at a changing-of-the-guard ceremony at the Neue Wache on the Unter den Linden in East Berlin

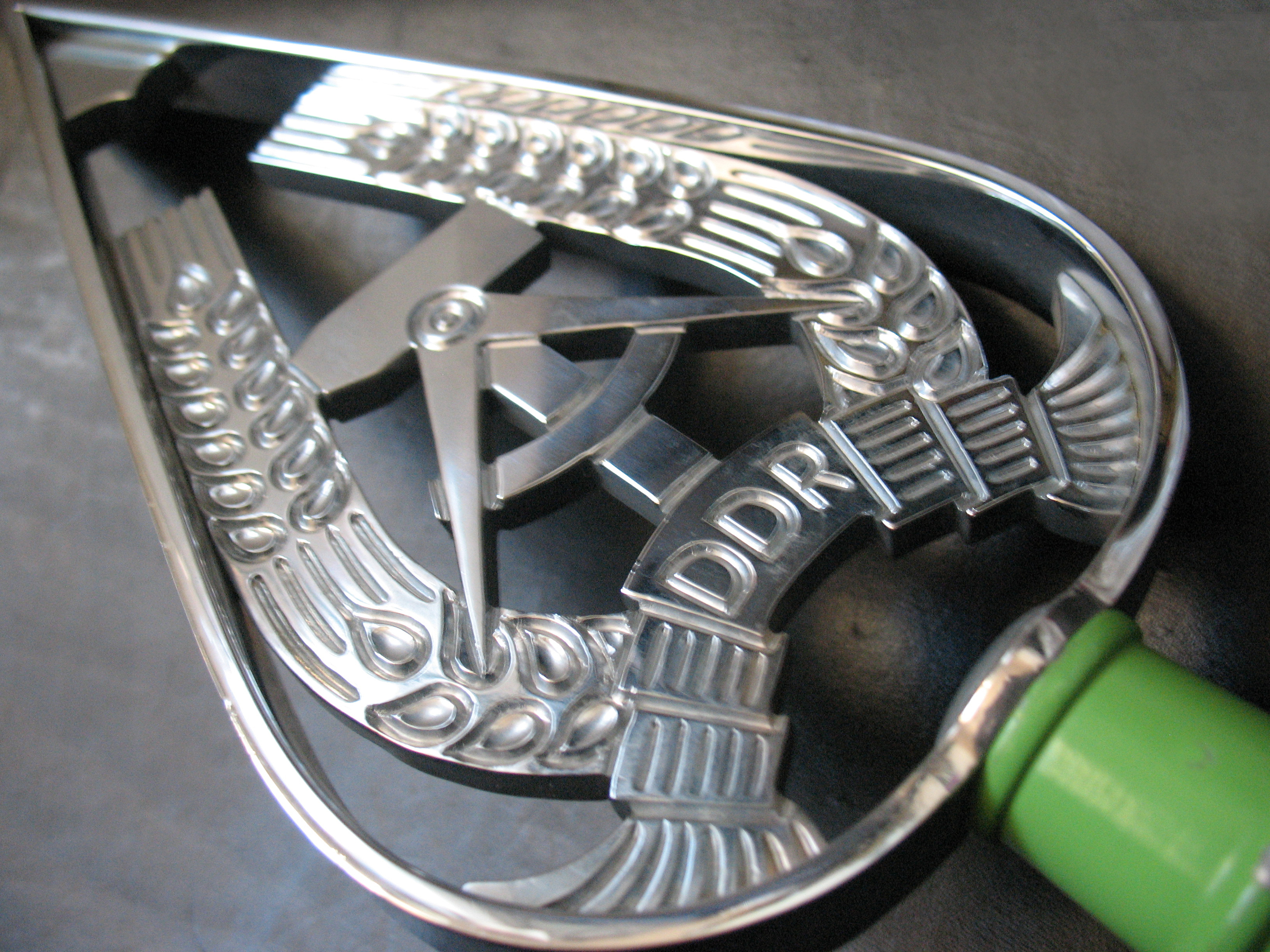
A DDR finial, here for a flag of a Ministry of the Interior (MdI) unit; the NVA had the same in gold.

=== Founding ===
The German Democratic Republic (DDR) established the National People's Army on 1 March 1956 (six months after the formation of the West German Bundeswehr) from the Kasernierte Volkspolizei. This formation culminated years of preparation during which former Wehrmacht officers and communist veterans of the Spanish Civil War helped organize and train paramilitary units of the People's Police. Though the NVA featured a German appearance – including uniforms and ceremonies patterned after older German military traditions – its doctrine and structure showed the strong influence of the Soviet Armed Forces.

=== Wehrmacht Veterans ===
During its first year, about 27 percent of the NVA's officer corps had formerly served in the Wehrmacht. Of the 82 highest command positions, ex-Wehrmacht officers held 61; however, very few of them had served in high ranks. The military knowledge and combat experience of these veterans were indispensable in the NVA's early years, although by the 1960s most of these World War II veterans had retired. (The West German Bundeswehr was even more reliant on Wehrmacht veterans, who initially comprised the majority of its commissioned ranks.)

==== Notable former Wehrmacht officers in the NVA command ====
The following list includes the NVA generals who were awarded the Knight's Cross of the Iron Cross in the Wehrmacht during the Second World War.

- Generalmajor Wilhelm Adam (17 December 1942 as Oberst)
- Generalmajor Otto Korfes (22 January 1943 as Generalmajor)
- Generalleutnant Vincenz Müller (7 April 1944 as Generalleutnant)

The following list includes the NVA generals who were awarded the German Cross in the Wehrmacht during the Second World War.

- Generalmajor Rudolf Bamler (12 March 1942 as Oberst)
- Generalmajor Bernhard Bechler (28 January 1943 as Major)
- Generalmajor Otto Korfes (11 January 1942 as Oberst)
- Generalmajor Arno von Lenski (21 January 1943 as Generalmajor)
- Generalleutnant Vincenz Müller (26 January 1942 as Oberst i.G.)
- Generalmajor Hans Wulz (25 January 1943 as Generalmajor)

=== Deployment ===
The NVA never took part in full-scale combat, although it participated in a support role in the suppression of the Prague Spring of 1968, provided medical support during the Soviet–Afghan War, and NVA officers often served as combat advisers in Africa. Some of the first NVA advisors went to the Republic of the Congo in 1973. During the 1980s at various times the NVA had advisors in Algeria, Angola, Ethiopia, Guinea, Iraq, Libya, Mozambique, South Yemen, and Syria. In 1984, there were 10,000 NVA personnel serving on the African continent, primarily in Angola and Mozambique. However, the NVA general staff limited their role to advisory and technical functions, resisting Soviet pressure to commit regular combat formations to African conflicts.

When the Soviet Union prepared to occupy Czechoslovakia in 1968, the DDR government committed the 7th Panzer Division and the 11th Motorised Infantry Division to support the intervention (assigned to 20th Guards Army and 1st Guards Tank Army respectively), becoming the first deployment of German troops outside Germany for the first time since the Second World War. But the East German participation raised Czech ire, and the two divisions were "kept out of sight in the Bohemian forests" and allowed to travel only at night. In a few days they were withdrawn.

In the early 1970s the Group of Soviet Forces in Germany (GSFG) high command assigned to the NVA the wartime mission of capturing West Berlin. The NVA plan for the operation, designated "Operation Centre", called for some 32,000 troops in two divisions, accompanied by the GSFG's Soviet 6th Separate Guards Motor Rifle Brigade. The plan was regularly updated until 1988, when a less ambitious plan that simply aimed at containing Berlin was substituted.

In the autumn of 1981 the NVA stood ready to intervene in Poland in support of a possible Soviet invasion, but the declaration of martial law in Poland (13 December 1981) averted the crisis.

The NVA went into a state of heightened combat readiness on several occasions, including the construction of the Berlin Wall in 1961, the Cuban Missile Crisis in 1962, the 1968 invasion of Czechoslovakia, and, for the last time, in late 1989 as protests swept through the DDR.

During the Peaceful Revolution that led to the downfall of the DDR's communist government, some NVA forces were placed on alert but were never deployed against protesters. At the same time, the Soviet government ordered its troops in the DDR to remain in barracks. After the forced retirement of SED and state leader Erich Honecker and other conservatives from the ruling Politburo at the height of the crisis in October 1989, the new SED leadership ruled out using armed force against the protesters.

=== Ideology ===
Like the ruling communist parties of other Soviet-aligned countries, the Socialist Unity Party of Germany (SED) assured control by appointing loyal party members to top positions and by organizing intensive political education for all ranks. The proportion of SED members in the officer corps rose steadily after the early 1960s, eventually reaching almost 95 percent.

The NVA saw itself as the "instrument of power of the working class" (Machtinstrument der Arbeiterklasse). According to its doctrine, the NVA protected peace and secured the achievements of socialism by maintaining a convincing deterrent to imperialist aggression. The NVA's motto, inscribed on its flag, read: "For the Protection of the Workers' and Farmers' Power".

The DDR's National Defense Council controlled the armed forces, but the mobile forces came under the Warsaw Pact Unified Command. Political control of the armed forces took place through close integration with the Socialist Unity Party of Germany (SED), which vetted all officers. Military training (provided by the school system) and the growing militarization of East German society bolstered popular support for the military establishment. From a Leninist perspective, the NVA stood as a symbol of Soviet-East German solidarity and became the model communist institution – ideological, hierarchical, and disciplined. The NVA synthesized communist and Prussian symbolism, naming its officers' academy, the Friedrich Engels Military Academy, after Karl Marx's co-author Friedrich Engels, and its highest medal after Prussian Army General Gerhard von Scharnhorst.

=== Composition ===
In its first six years the NVA operated as an all-volunteer force. West Germany, in contrast, re-introduced universal military service in 1956. The DDR first introduced conscription in 1962. According to the Parallel History Project on Cooperative Security:

the NVA was incorporated in the Warsaw Pact and consisted of army, air force/air defense (Luftstreitkräfte/Luftverteidigung), and the People’s Navy (Volksmarine). At its peak in 1987, the three NVA services had about 156,000 men under arms altogether. Between 1956 and 1990, about 2.5 million male GDR citizens performed army duty.

The manpower of the NVA consisted of some 85,000 soldiers in 1962, climbed to 127,000 by 1967, and remained essentially steady through 1970. In 1987, at the peak of its power, the NVA numbered 175,300 troops. Approximately 50% of this number were career soldiers, while the others were short-term conscripts.

According to a 1973 study, NVA leaders from the late 1950s through the 1960s came predominantly from working-class backgrounds, with few from middle-class or professional families and no representatives of the aristocracy present in the upper echelons. Excepting specialized military or political instruction, most NVA leaders reported primary school as their highest level of formal education.

=== Post-unification ===
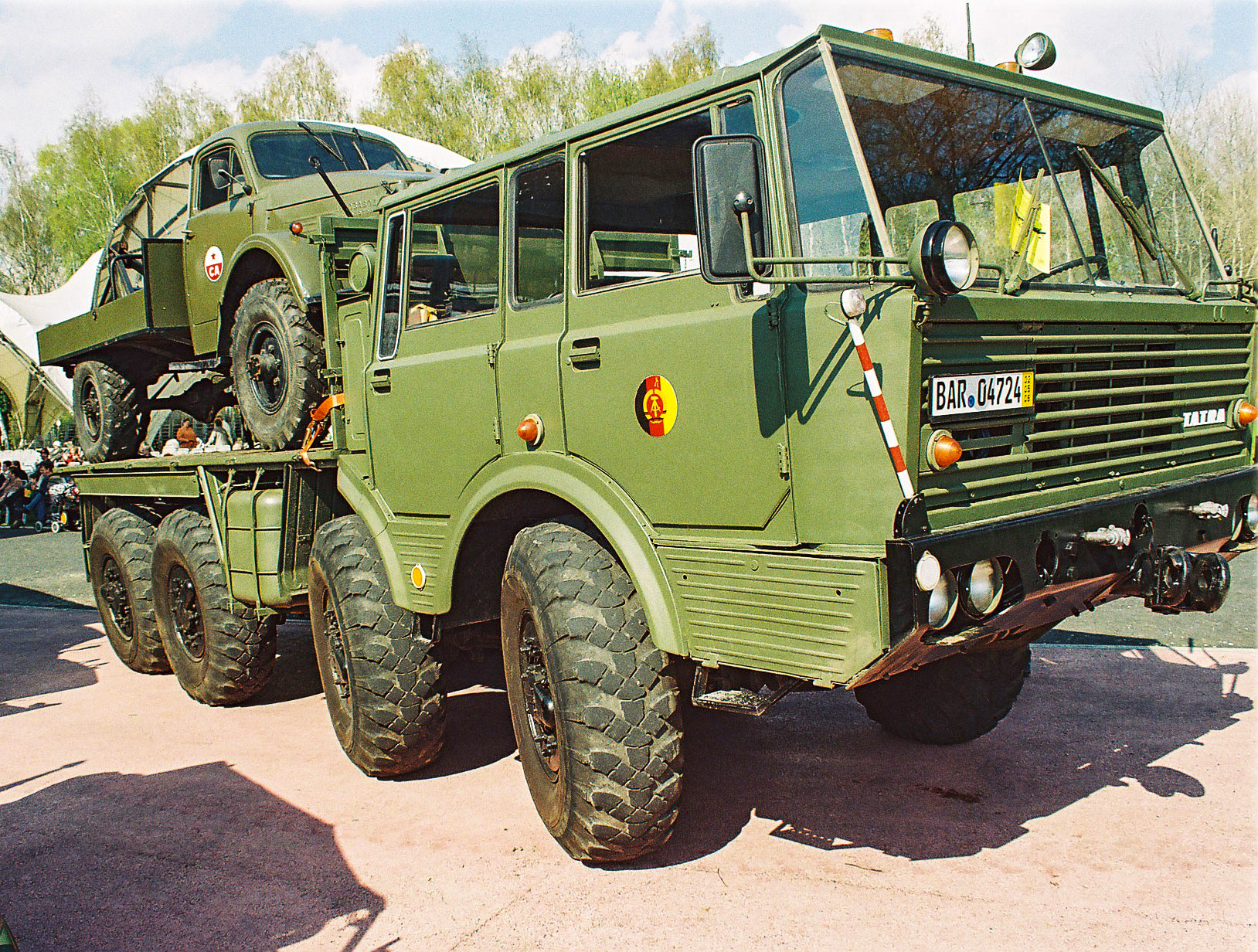
An NVA Tatra-813 carrying a GAZ-63

The NVA disbanded with the dissolution of the East German government in October 1990. Under the process of "Army of Unity" (Armee der Einheit), NVA facilities and equipment were handed over to the Bundeswehr, the federal defense force of the unified Germany. Bundeswehr Eastern Command (Bundeswehrkommando Ost) was set up for the control of units or facilities in the territory of former East Germany, and was led by Lieutenant General Jörg Schönbohm. Most facilities closed, and equipment was either sold or given to other countries. Most of the NVA's 36,000 officers and NCOs were let go, including all officers above the rank of Oberstleutnant. The Bundeswehr retained only 3,200 – after a demotion of one rank. In addition, all female soldiers (at this point it was still prohibited for women to become soldiers in the Bundeswehr) and all soldiers over the age of 55 were discharged.

Until 1 March 2005, Germany listed time served in the NVA as time "served in a foreign military". Service in the NVA did not count for points towards federal pensions in the unified Germany. Retired NVA soldiers and officers received only minimal pensions after unification: a thirty-year veteran would receive a pension smaller than a graduate-student stipend. After the reform of 2005, service in the NVA became known as "served outside of the Bundeswehr".

Many former NVA officers feel bitter about their treatment after unification. While receiving only minimal pensions, few have been able to find jobs except as laborers or security guards. Former NVA officers are not permitted to append their NVA rank to their name as a professional title; no such prohibition applies to rank attained in the Wehrmacht or in the Waffen-SS during the Nazi era.

One of the few former NVA facilities to remain open was a base in Storkow near Berlin, which housed the NVA's camouflage and deception center. This became the Bundeswehr Unit for Camouflage and Deception.

== Utilization of former NVA material after 1990 ==
The emblem of the Landstreitkräfte – used on army vehicles

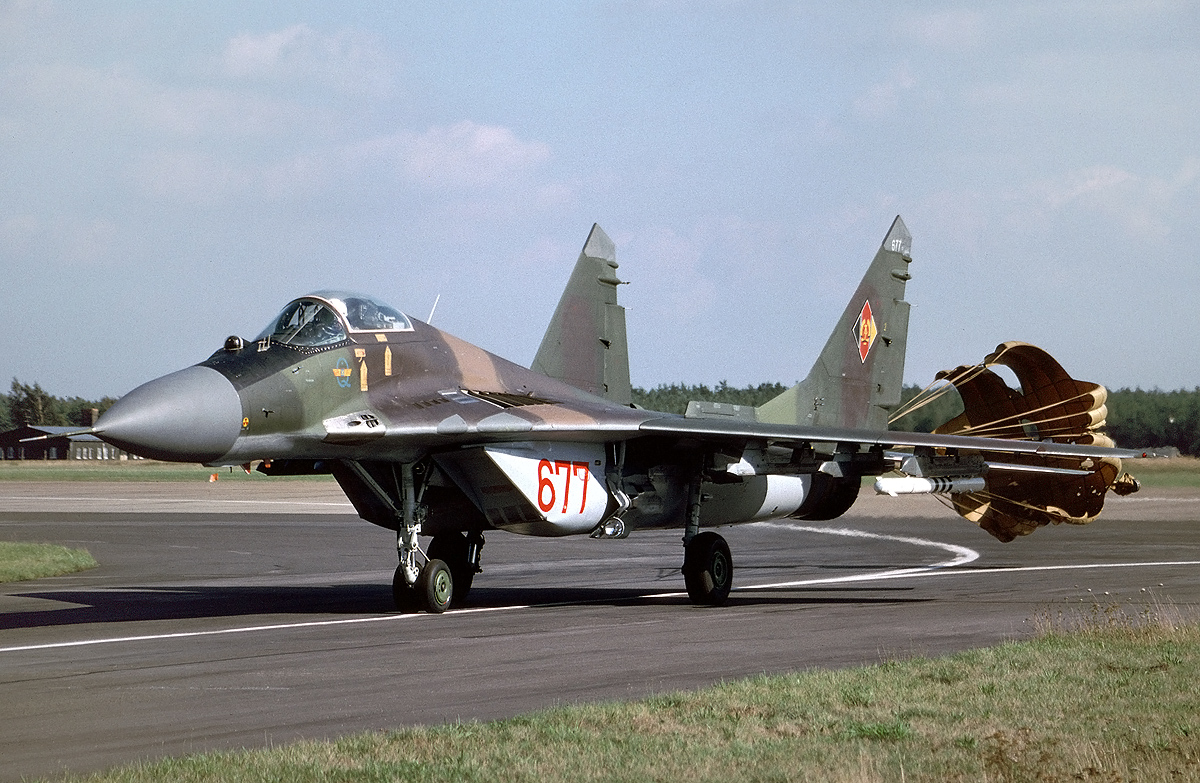
MiG-29 in East German service

The NVA was, in relation to its equipment and training, one of the strongest armies in the Warsaw Pact. It was equipped with a large number of modern weapons systems, most of Soviet origin, from which a small portion were returned to the Soviet Union in 1990.

The remaining equipment and materiel was still substantial, including large quantities of replacement parts, medical supplies, atomic, biological and chemical warfare equipment, training devices and simulators, etc.

One of the first measures taken after the reunification was a survey and securing of weapons and devices by former members of the NVA. The federally operated Materiel Depot Service Gesellschaft (MDSG) was charged with taking custody of and warehousing this equipment. The MDSG employed 1,820 people who were primarily taken from the Bundeswehr. The MDSG was privatised in 1994. Much of the materiel was given free of charge to beneficiaries in the new federal states or other departments, to museums, or to friendly nations in the context of military support for developing countries. The German Federal Intelligence Service secretly sold NVA equipment to several countries, violating international and German laws as well as international treaties. The rest was destroyed.

- 767 aircraft (helicopters, fixed wing aircraft), 24 of which were MiG-29s
- 208 ships
- 2,761 tanks
- 133,900 wheeled vehicles
- 2,199 artillery pieces
- 1,376,650 firearms
- 303,690 tons of ammunition
- 14,335 tons of fuel and cleaning materials

24 modern MIG-29s became part of the Luftwaffe. After 1999, 22 of the 24 aircraft were given to Poland.

== Recruitment and conscientious objection ==
Before the construction of the Berlin Wall in 1961, military service in the DDR was voluntary, though the Free German Youth and public schools mounted intensive recruitment drives, and service in the NVA was often a prerequisite for career advancement. Compulsory military service had been introduced in 1956 in West Germany, one year after the West German military was established, but the DDR held back from this step until 1962. The situation changed when the border was sealed in August 1961, and five months later the government announced a mandatory service term of 18 months for men.

There was, at first, no alternative service for conscientious objectors. This changed in 1964 when, under pressure from the Protestant Church in Germany, the DDR's National Defence Council authorised the formation of Baueinheiten (construction units) for men of draft age who "refuse military service with weapons on the grounds of religious viewpoints or for similar reasons".

The construction soldiers wore uniforms and lived in barracks under military discipline, but were not required to bear arms and received no combat training. In theory, they were to be used only for civilian construction projects. The DDR therefore became the only Warsaw Pact country to provide a non-combat alternative for conscientious objectors. However, fearing that other soldiers would be contaminated by pacifist ideas, the government took care to segregate the construction units from regular conscripts. Moreover, conscripts who chose the alternative service option often faced discrimination later in life, including denial of opportunities for higher education.

== Organization ==
The logo of the East German museum in Dresden. Today the Bundeswehr Military History Museum.

The NVA had four main branches:

- The Landstreitkräfte (Ground Forces) with an active strength of 108,000 in the following divisions:

| Number | Type | Headquarters | Line | Military District |
|---|---|---|---|---|
| 1st | Motor Rifle | Potsdam | 1st Line | V Neubrandenburg |
| 4th | Motor Rifle | Erfurt | 1st Line | III (South) Leipzig |
| 6th | Motor Rifle | Königswartha | 2nd Line | III (South) Leipzig |
| 7th | Panzer | Dresden | 1st Line | III (South) Leipzig |
| 8th | Motor Rifle | Schwerin | 1st Line | V Neubrandenburg |
| 9th | Panzer | Eggesin | 1st Line | V Neubrandenburg |
| 10th | Motor Rifle | Ronneburg | 2nd Line | III (South) Leipzig |
| 11th | Motor Rifle | Halle | 1st Line | III (South) Leipzig |
| 17th | Motor Rifle | Petersroda | 2nd Line | III (South) Leipzig |
| 19th | Motor Rifle | Wulkow | Reserve | V Neubrandenburg |
| 20th | Motor Rifle | Bredenfelde | Reserve | V Neubrandenburg |

- The Volksmarine (People's Navy) with a strength of 18,300
- The Luftstreitkräfte/Luftverteidigung (Air Forces/Air Defence) with a strength of 58,000

In wartime, mobilization of the NVA's reserves would have nearly doubled its strength. DDR authorities also had at their disposal the internal security troops of the Ministry of the Interior (the Kasernierte Volkspolizei) and the Ministry for State Security (the Felix Dzerzhinsky Guards Regiment) along with the 210,000 strong party auxiliary "Combat Groups of the Working Class" (Kampfgruppen der Arbeiterklasse), who were available in times of war.

The highest level of leadership for the NVA was the Ministry for National Defense (Ministerium für Nationale Verteidigung) headquartered in Strausberg near East Berlin. NVA administration was divided into the following commands:

- the Kommando Landstreitkräfte (KdoLaSK) based in Geltow near Potsdam
- the Kommando Luftstreitkräfte und Luftverteidigungskräfte (KdoLSK/LV) based in Strausberg
- the Kommando Volksmarine (KdoVM) based in Rostock
- the Kommando der Grenztruppen (KdoGT) based in Pätz near Berlin

== Education ==
Officer training took place in officer training colleges:

- Wilhelm Pieck Military Political Academy
- Friedrich Engels Military Academy
- Ernst Thälmann Officers' School of the Land Forces (Löbau and Zittau)
- Rosa Luxemburg Officers' School of the Border Troops (Plauen, from 1984 in Suhl)
- Franz Mehring Officers' School of the Air Force (Kamenz)
- Karl Liebknecht Officers' School of the Volksmarine (Stralsund/Schwedenschanze)

For the training of medical officers, the Military Medical Section at the University of Greifswald existed from 1955, and from 1981 the Military Medical Academy at Bad Saarow. To prepare for officer training, there was also a cadet school in Naumburg from 1956 to 1960. Furthermore, there were several non-commissioned officer schools for temporary non-commissioned officers and career non-commissioned officers. The latter obtained their master craftsman's certificate in a second course after several years of service. From 1959 onwards, selected cadres could also be delegated to study directly at various officer training schools in the Soviet Union. In Prora and Rügen, the Otto Winzer Officer Training Academy for Foreign Military Cadres was also available.

== Military Intelligence ==
The National People's Army had a Military Intelligence Agency, founded in 1952, whose purpose was to "prevent surprise by the enemy."

=== Directors ===
- 1952–1957 Major General Karl Linke
- 1957–1959 Colonel Willy Sägebrecht
- 1959–1974 Lieutenant General Arthur Franke
- 1974–1982 Lieutenant General Theo Gregori
- 1982–1990 Lieutenant General Alfred Krause
- 1990-disbanded Colonel Manfred Zeise

== Appearance ==
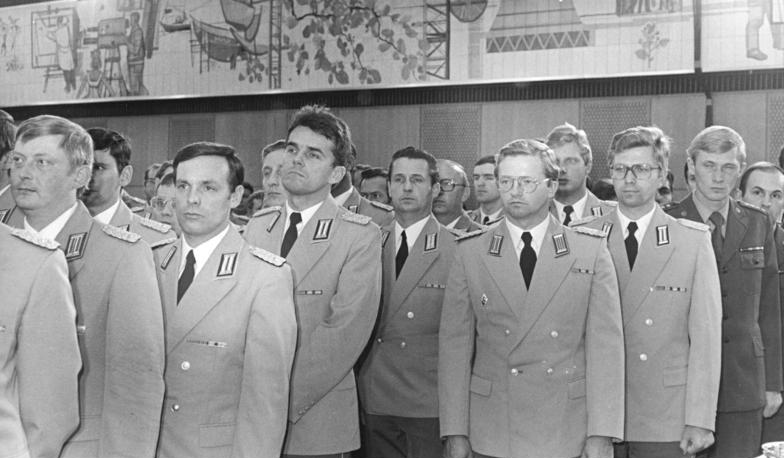
Mess uniforms worn by NVA officers

=== Uniforms ===
The first military units of the Central Training Administration (Hauptverwaltung Ausbildung – HVA) were dressed in police blue. With the restructuring of the Barracked Police (CIP) in 1952, khaki uniforms similar in shape and colour to those of the Soviet Army were introduced. The desire for a separate "German" and "socialist" military tradition, and the consequent founding of the NVA in 1956, introduced new uniforms which strongly resembled those of the Wehrmacht. They were of a similar cut and made of a brownish-gray, called stone gray, cloth. The dark high-necked collar was later removed, except on the coats from 1974 to 1979.

Even the NVA's M-56 "gumdrop" army helmet, in spite of its easily noticeable resemblance to well-known Soviet designs, was actually based on a prototype "B / II" helmet that was initially developed for the Wehrmacht by the Institute for Defence Technical Materials Science in Berlin. The helmet had seen trials since 1943, but was not adopted by the Wehrmacht.

With the exceptions of the People's Navy, whose dark-blue uniforms were consistent with the styles of most navies around the world, and the Combat Groups of the Working Class (Kampfgruppen der Arbeiterklasse), who wore their own olive-green fatigue uniforms, all NVA armed services, the Felix Dzerzhinsky Guards Regiment, the Border Troops of the German Democratic Republic, and the Kasernierte Volkspolizei wore the same basic uniform. Several later modifications were introduced, but the style and cut remain fundamentally the same. There were a variety of uniforms worn according to the setting (work or social) and season (summer or winter). Most uniforms (service, semi-dress, and parade) were stone grey, a brownish-grey colour that was conspicuously different from the grey-green of the People's Police. Officers' uniforms differed from those of enlisted personnel by better quality and texture cloth. The field and service uniforms were normal attire for most day-to-day functions.

=== Uniform categories ===
Several basic categories of uniforms were worn:

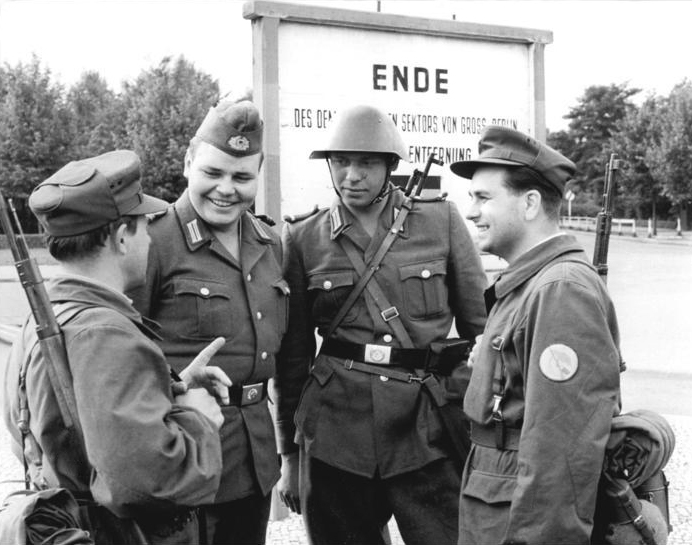
DDR borderguards and members of the Combat Groups of the Working Class at the border of the Berlin sector on 14 August 1961

==== Parade uniform (Paradeuniform) ====
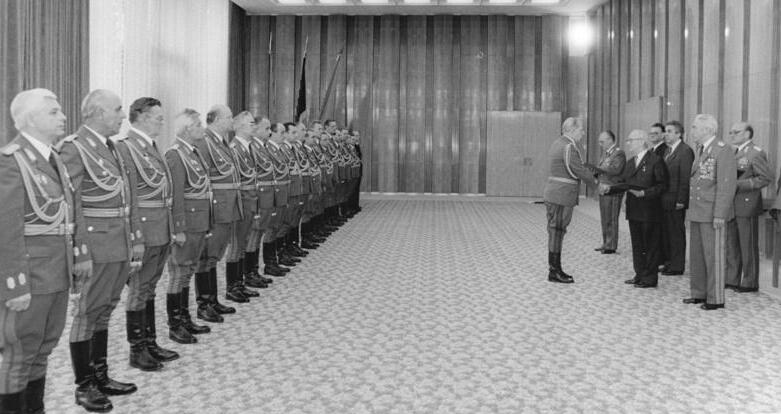
NVA generals wearing parade uniforms in a 1984 promotion and awards ceremony

The parade uniform for ground forces and air force officers was the semi-dress/walking-out tunic with all authorized orders, awards and decorations attached, breeches and riding boots, steel helmet, white shirt, dark-gray necktie, and a ceremonial dagger worn on the left side and fastened to a silver-gray parade belt. Officers in guards of honor, as well as the officer faculty of cadet schools when on parade, carried sabers. General officers wore the peaked cap with the parade dress. In winter, a greatcoat, scarf, and gloves were worn with it. Naval officers and petty officers and up wore dark blue uniforms with a peaked cap while junior ratings wore sailor caps.

==== Service uniform (Dienstuniform) ====
The summer service uniform for officers was a bloused jacket, called a Hemdbluse, worn with a shirt, trousers, and a visored service cap. The winter service uniform featured a tunic with four large buttoned-down patch pockets, a black waist belt, the service cap, breeches, shirt, tie, and pants belt; high boots were reserved for officers and NCOs. A long, heavy, belted greatcoat was also part of the winter uniform.

==== Semi-dress/walking-out uniform (Ausgangsuniform) ====
With a few details, the semi-dress uniform was the same for all ranks and was worn for walking-out purposes (i.e. off-duty and off-post). It consisted of a single-breasted tunic without belt, a silver-gray shirt with dark-gray tie, the service cap, long trousers, and black low-quarter shoes. Officers also wore the tunic with a white shirt. During periods of warm weather, there was the option of omitting the tunic, and furthermore omitting the tie. A double-breasted jacket was optional for officers and warrant officers.

==== Field service uniform (Felddienstuniform) ====
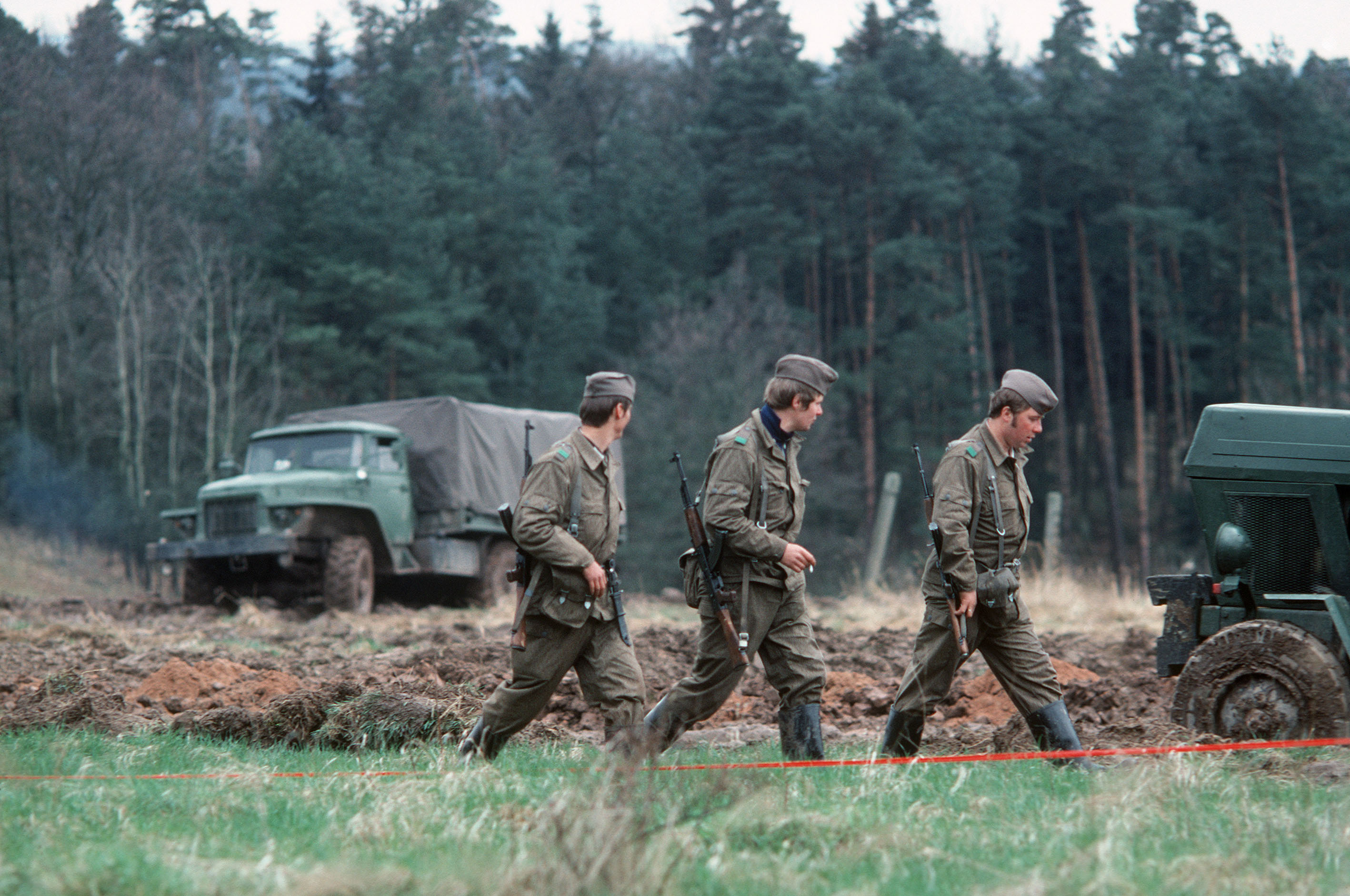
The field uniform as worn by DDR border troops

The summer field uniform for both officers and enlisted consisted of a jacket and trousers originally in Flachtarnenmuster and then in Strichtarn, a dark-brown (later a forest green) raindrop camouflage pattern on a stone-gray background; a field cap, service cap, or steel helmet; high black boots; and a gray webbing belt with y-strap suspenders. In winter, a quilted stone gray padded suit without a camouflage pattern was worn over the service uniform. Later winter uniforms were also of the same camouflage pattern as the summer variant. The winter uniform also included a fur pile cap or a steel helmet, boots, knitted gray gloves, belt, and suspenders.

==== Work uniform (Arbeitsuniform) ====
Seasonal considerations and weather governed the kind of work uniforms worn. Generally, reconditioned articles of service uniforms (field, semi-dress, and padded winter uniforms) were dyed black and issued for all types of fatigue and maintenance details. Coveralls are also used by the lower ranks, especially armor and air force personnel. Officers in technical branches supervising fatigue details wore a laboratory-style smock.

==== Other uniforms ====
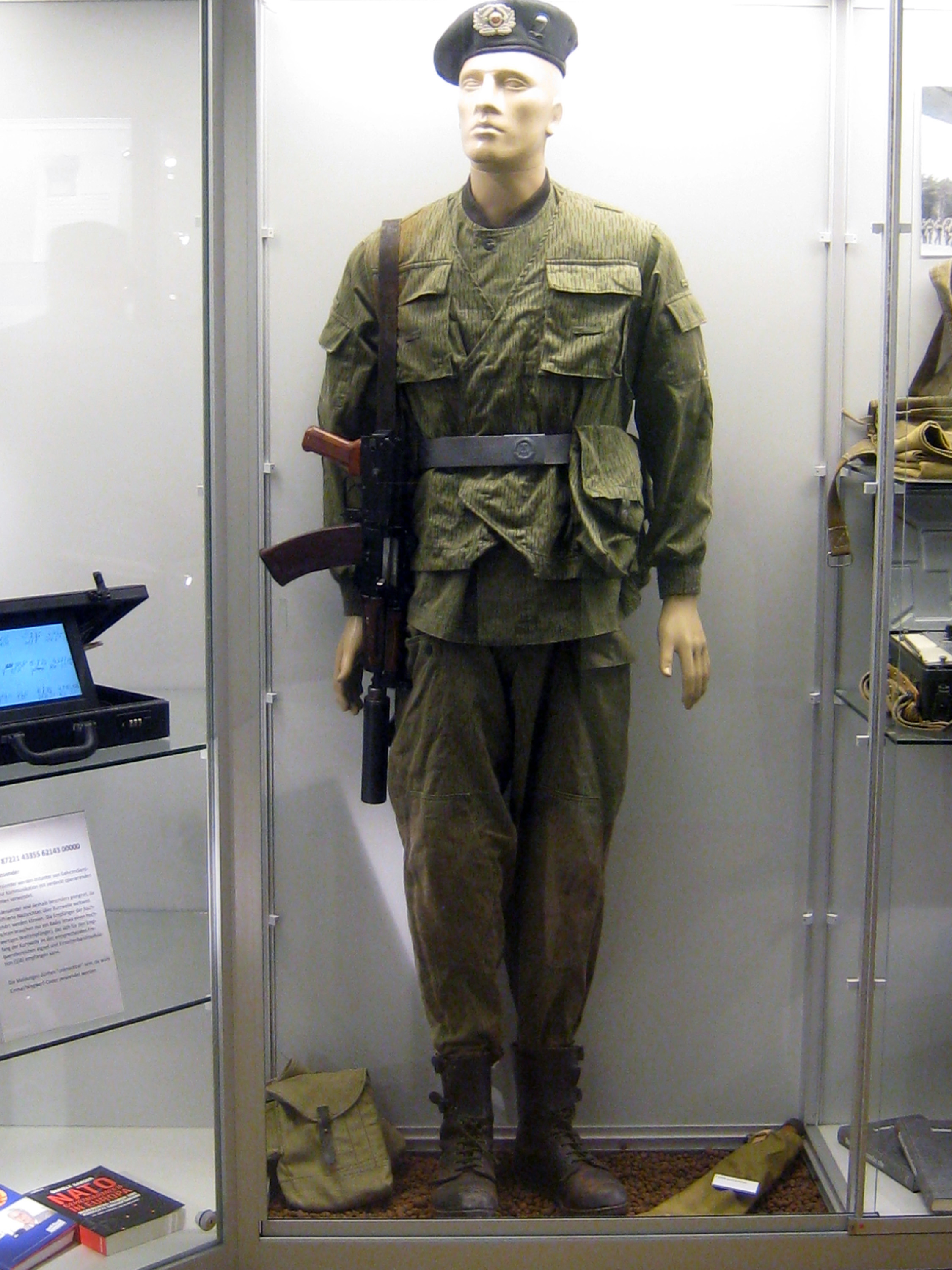
An NVA Fallschirmjäger uniform

High-ranking officers occasionally wore white uniforms (or white jackets), and staff officers were issued distinctive staff service uniforms.

Women wore uniforms consisting of jackets, skirts or slacks, blouses, caps, boots or pumps, and other appropriate items according to season and occasion.

Personnel, such as paratroopers, motorcyclists, and tank troops, wore additional items with their uniforms identifying them as such. The parachute units of NVA used Polish wz. 63 helmets.

=== Waffenfarben ===
NVA personnel initially wore the Waffenfarben as worn by the Wehrmacht, but later reverted to white except for generals who wore red.

The uniforms of the Border Troops were distinguished from that of the NVA ground force and Air Force/Air Defense Force by a green armband with large silver letters identifying the wearer's affiliation.

Felix Dzerzhinsky Guards Regiment uniforms were nearly identical to those of the NVA and were distinguished primarily by the dark red MfS service color of its insignia and by an honorary cuff-band on the left sleeve bearing the regiment's name. Other Stasi officers wore a similar uniform, but without the cuff-band.

=== Rank insignia ===
NVA personnel displayed their rank insignia on shoulder boards or shoulder loops on service, semi-dress, and parade uniforms, and subdued sleeve insignia midway between the shoulder and elbow on the left sleeve of the field uniform, coveralls, or other special uniforms. A general officer rank was denoted by five-pointed silver stars mounted on a gold and silver braided shoulder cord set on a bright red base. All other officers and NCOs wore a four-pointed star. Like many of the armies of the other Warsaw Pact countries, NVA rank insignia followed the Soviet pattern in the arrangement of stars.

The Volksmarine followed similar shoulder insignia for the naval officers (who also used sleeve insignia) and enlisted ratings except that these were blue and white or yellow (in the case of naval ratings).

=== Awards and decorations ===
The DDR had some seventy decorations for persons or groups it wished to recognize, and it bestowed them liberally. Some, such as battle decorations, were specifically set aside for armed forces personnel, many awarded to soldiers and civilians alike, and others, although ordinarily civilian awards, can on occasion be earned by those on military duty. The latter group included decorations for achievement in the arts, literature, production, and work methods. They were awarded to service personnel or specific units that participated in civil production projects or assisted during harvesting.

The Order of Karl Marx, Patriotic Order of Merit, Star of People's Friendship, Banner of Labor, Order of Scharnhorst, and the National Prize were among the more important awards. Some, including the Order of Merit and the Star of People's Friendship, were awarded in three classes. A few were accompanied by substantial monetary premiums. The NVA did not permit military personnel to wear Wehrmacht awards and decorations.

== Periodicals ==
The two main periodicals of the NVA were the weekly newspaper Volksarmee and the monthly soldier's magazine Armeerundschau.

== Relics ==
The former Nazi holiday complex at Prora, on the island of Rügen, contains a number of museum displays. One of these is devoted to the NVA, which had used part of the complex as a barracks. Many German military museums host former NVA equipment like tanks and aircraft.

== See also ==
- Conscientious objection in East Germany
- Combat Groups of the Working Class
- Felix Dzerzhinsky Guards Regiment
- Distinguished Service Medal of the National People's Army
- Military history of Germany
- Bundeswehr
