= Krolow (surname) =

Krolow is a Low German surname. Notable people with the surname include:

- Karl Krolow (1915–1999), a German poet and translator
- Guilherme Seefeldt Krolow (born 1992), commonly known as Foguinho, a Brazilian footballer

== See also ==
- Królów, a village in the administrative district of Gmina Trzebiel, within Żary County, Lubusz Voivodeship, Poland (near the border with Germany)
