= Muskau Bend Landscape Park =

Protected area in Poland

- Park Krajobrazowy Łuk Mużakowa
- IUCN category V (protected landscape/seascape)
- Interactive map of Muskau Bend Landscape Park
- Location: Lubusz Voivodeship
- Coordinates: 51°45′N 14°46′E
- Area: 182.00 km^{2} (70.27 sq mi)
- Established: 2001

Muskau Bend Landscape Park (Park Krajobrazowy Łuk Mużakowa) is a protected area (Landscape Park) in western Poland, established in 2001, covering an area of 182.00 square kilometres (70.27 sq mi).

The Park lies within Lubusz Voivodeship, in Żary County (Łęknica, Gmina Brody, Gmina Przewóz, Gmina Trzebiel, Gmina Tuplice).
