= Mieszków, Lubusz Voivodeship =

Mieszków
- Village
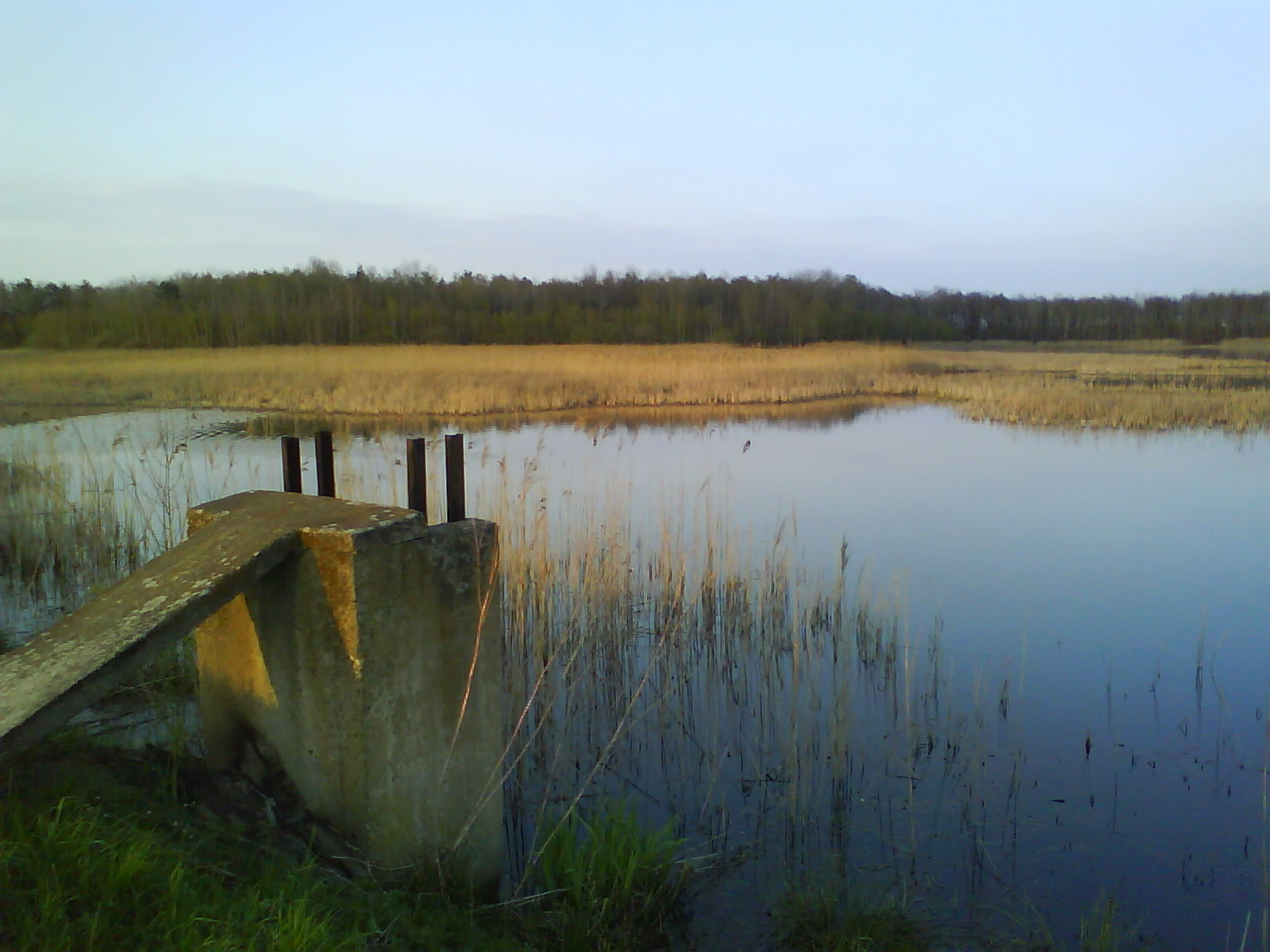
- Lake

- Location within Poland
- Coordinates: 51°35′55″N 14°53′0″E
- Country: Poland
- Voivodeship: Lubusz
- County: Żary
- Gmina: Trzebiel

Mieszków [ˈmjɛʂkuf] (German Beinsdorf; Lower Sorbian: Blasebalg) is a village in the administrative district of Gmina Trzebiel, within Żary County, Lubusz Voivodeship, in western Poland, close to the German border.
