= Przewoźniki =

- Village
- Location within Poland
- Coordinates: 51°32′N 14°48′E
- Country: Poland
- Voivodeship: Lubusz
- County: Żary
- Gmina: Trzebiel

Przewoźniki [pʂɛvɔʑˈniki] (Lower Sorbian: Nosarje; Upper Sorbian: Nošerjo) is a village in the administrative district of Gmina Trzebiel, within Żary County, Lubusz Voivodeship, in western Poland, close to the German border.
