= Wicina =

- Village
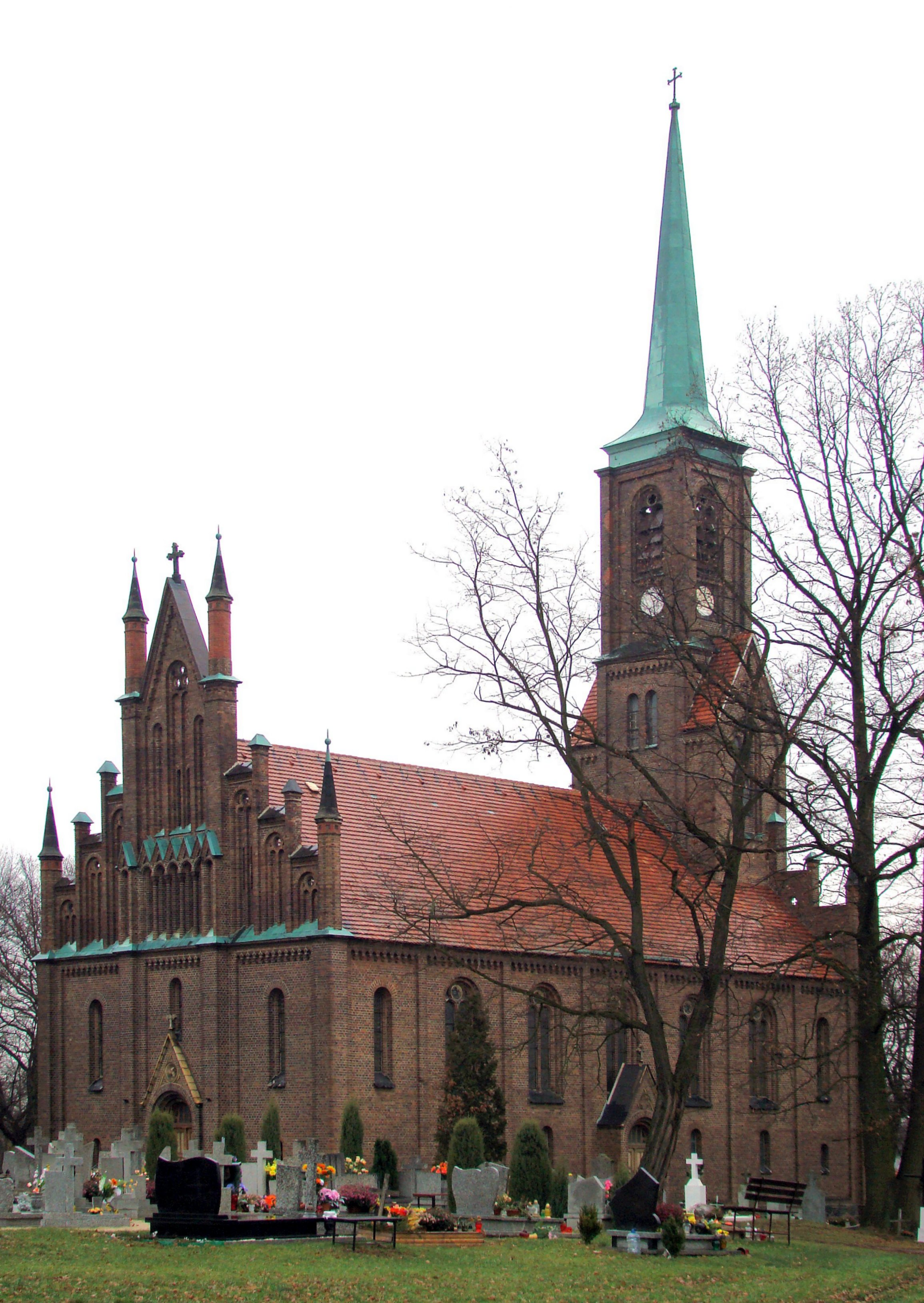
- Catholic church

- Location within Poland
- Coordinates: 51°46′N 15°4′E
- Country: Poland
- Voivodeship: Lubusz
- County: Żary
- Gmina: Jasień

Wicina [viˈt͡ɕina] is a village in the administrative district of Gmina Jasień, within Żary County, Lubusz Voivodeship, in western Poland.
