= Jabłoniec, Lubusz Voivodeship =

Jabłoniec
- Village
- Location within Poland
- Coordinates: 51°43′N 15°1′E
- Country: Poland
- Voivodeship: Lubusz
- County: Żary
- Gmina: Jasień
- Population: 270

Jabłoniec [jaˈbwɔɲɛt͡s] (Lower Sorbian: Jabłucyna; Upper Sorbian: Jabłučina) is a village in the administrative district of Gmina Jasień, within Żary County, Lubusz Voivodeship, in western Poland.
