= Bieszków =

- Village
- Location within Poland
- Coordinates: 51°44′N 15°4′E
- Country: Poland
- Voivodeship: Lubusz
- County: Żary
- Gmina: Jasień

Bieszków ([ˈbjɛʂkuf]; Lower Sorbian: Běškow) is a village in the administrative district of Gmina Jasień, within Żary County, Lubusz Voivodeship, in western Poland.
