= Łuków, Lubusz Voivodeship =

Łuków
- Village
- Location within Poland
- Coordinates: 51°34′N 14°52′E
- Country: Poland
- Voivodeship: Lubusz
- County: Żary
- Gmina: Trzebiel
- Population: 110

Łuków [ˈwukuf] (Lower Sorbian: Bögen; Upper Sorbian: Skłonjować) is a village in the administrative district of Gmina Trzebiel, within Żary County, Lubusz Voivodeship, in western Poland, close to the German border.
