= Jasionów, Lubusz Voivodeship =

Jasionów
- Village
- Location within Poland
- Coordinates: 51°36′N 14°51′E
- Country: Poland
- Voivodeship: Lubusz
- County: Żary
- Gmina: Trzebiel

Jasionów [jaˈɕɔnuf] (Lower Sorbian: Jasionow; Upper Sorbian: Jazionow) is a village in the administrative district of Gmina Trzebiel, within Żary County, Lubusz Voivodeship, in western Poland, close to the German border.
