= Siemiradz, Lubusz Voivodeship =

Siemiradz
- Settlement
- Location within Poland
- Coordinates: 51°32′47″N 14°53′10″E
- Country: Poland
- Voivodeship: Lubusz
- County: Żary
- Gmina: Trzebiel

Siemiradz [ɕɛˈmirat͡s] (German Neudorf) is a settlement in the administrative district of Gmina Trzebiel, within Żary County, Lubusz Voivodeship, in western Poland, close to the German border.

== See also ==
Territorial changes of Poland after World War II
