= Czaple, Lubusz Voivodeship =

Czaple
- Village
- Location within Poland
- Coordinates: 51°33′30″N 14°48′30″E
- Country: Poland
- Voivodeship: Lubusz
- County: Żary
- Gmina: Trzebiel

Czaple [ˈt͡ʂaplɛ] (Upper Sorbian: Rjad) is a village in the administrative district of Gmina Trzebiel, within Żary County, Lubusz Voivodeship, in western Poland, close to the German border.
