= Kamienica nad Nysą Łużycką =

- Village
- Location within Poland
- Coordinates: 51°37′33″N 14°47′27″E
- Country: Poland
- Voivodeship: Lubusz
- County: Żary
- Gmina: Trzebiel
- Population: 110

Kamienica nad Nysą Łużycką [kamjɛˈnit͡sa ˌnad ˈnɨsɔ̃ wuˈʐɨt͡skɔ̃] (German: Kemnitz; Lower Sorbian: Namjaŕska wjaža pśi Uniwersitce Łużycka; Upper Sorbian: Mietshaus an der Nysa Łużycka) is a village in the administrative district of Gmina Trzebiel, within Żary County, Lubusz Voivodeship, in western Poland, close to the German border.
