= Świbna =

- Village
- Location within Poland
- Coordinates: 51°43′36″N 15°03′00″E
- Country: Poland
- Voivodeship: Lubusz
- County: Żary
- Gmina: Jasień

Świbna [ˈɕfibna] is a village in the administrative district of Gmina Jasień, within Żary County, Lubusz Voivodeship, in western Poland.
