= Rytwiny =

- Village
- Location within Poland
- Coordinates: 51°40′N 14°53′E
- Country: Poland
- Voivodeship: Lubusz
- County: Żary
- Gmina: Trzebiel

Rytwiny [rɨtˈfinɨ] (Lower Sorbian: Figury) is a village in the administrative district of Gmina Trzebiel, within Żary County, Lubusz Voivodeship, in western Poland, close to the German border.
