= Żarki Małe =

- Village
- Location within Poland
- Coordinates: 51°35′2″N 14°47′13″E
- Country: Poland
- Voivodeship: Lubusz
- County: Żary
- Gmina: Trzebiel

Żarki Małe [ˈʐarki ˈmawɛ] (Lower Sorbian: Małe Żarke) is a village in the administrative district of Gmina Trzebiel, within Żary County, Lubusz Voivodeship, in western Poland, close to the German border.
