= Pustków =

Pustków may refer to the following places in Poland:

- Pustków, Lower Silesian Voivodeship (south-west Poland)
- Pustków, Lubusz Voivodeship (west Poland)
- Pustków, Opole Voivodeship (south-west Poland)
- Pustków, Podkarpackie Voivodeship (south-east Poland)
