= Nowe Czaple, Lubusz Voivodeship =

Nowe Czaple
- Village
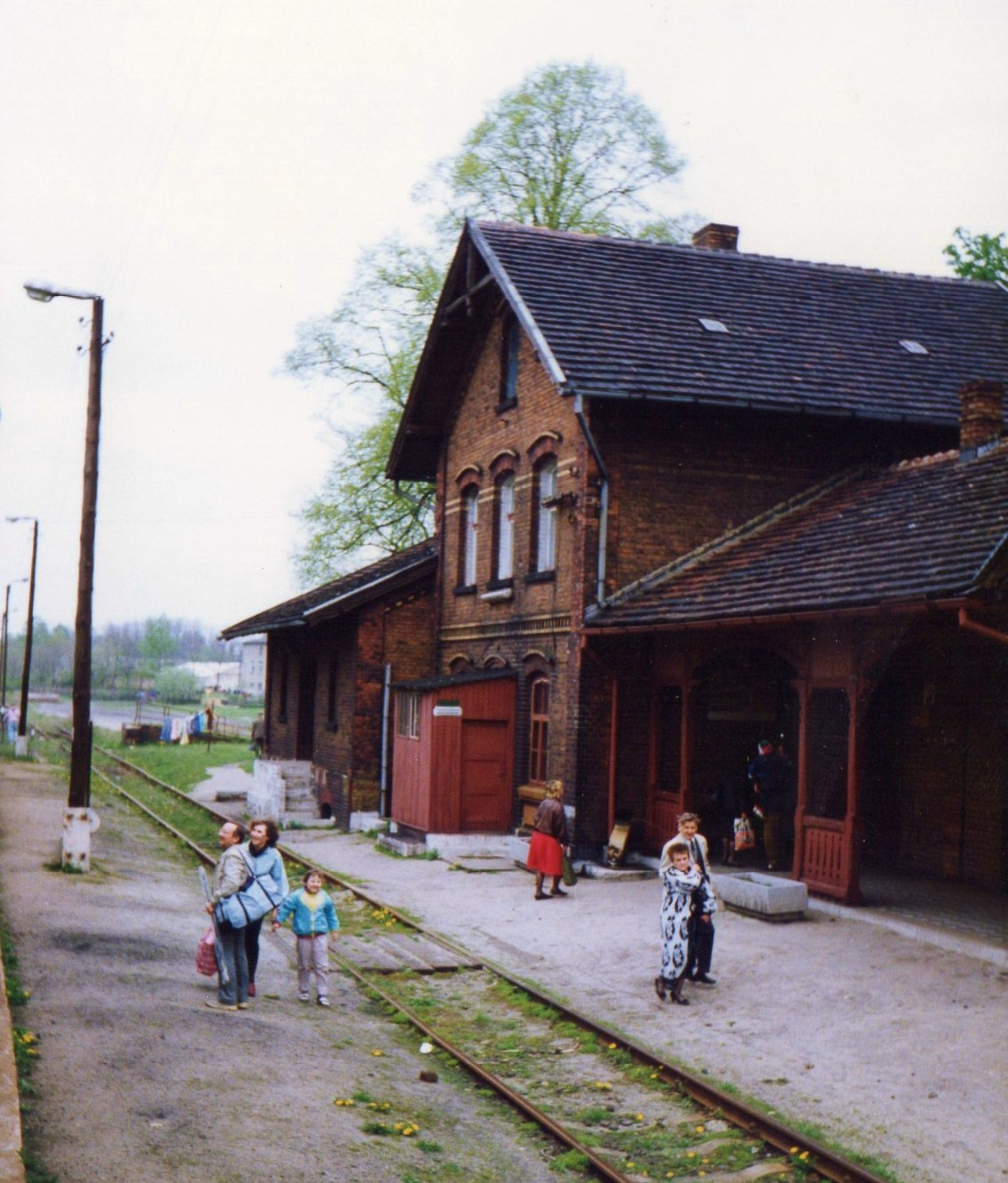
- Railway station

- Location within Poland
- Coordinates: 51°33′15″N 14°46′15″E
- Country: Poland
- Voivodeship: Lubusz
- County: Żary
- Gmina: Trzebiel

Nowe Czaple [ˈnɔvɛ ˈt͡ʂaplɛ] (Lower Sorbian: Nowy Rěd; Upper Sorbian: Nowy Rjek) is a village in the administrative district of Gmina Trzebiel, within Żary County, Lubusz Voivodeship, in western Poland, close to the German border.
