= Bogaczów =

Bogaczów may refer to:

- Bogaczów, Lower Silesian Voivodeship (south-west Poland)
- Bogaczów, Zielona Góra County in Lubusz Voivodeship (west Poland)
- Bogaczów, Żary County in Lubusz Voivodeship (west Poland)
