= Bukowina, Lubusz Voivodeship =

Bukowina
- Village
- Location within Poland
- Coordinates: 51°37′57″N 14°46′10″E
- Country: Poland
- Voivodeship: Lubusz
- County: Żary
- Gmina: Trzebiel
- Population: 50

Bukowina [bukɔˈvina] is a village in the administrative district of Gmina Trzebiel, within Żary County, Lubusz Voivodeship, in western Poland, close to the German border.
