= Bronice, Lubusz Voivodeship =

Bronice
- Village
- Location within Poland
- Coordinates: 51°43′6″N 14°57′59″E
- Country: Poland
- Voivodeship: Lubusz
- County: Żary
- Gmina: Jasień

Bronice [brɔˈnit͡sɛ] is a village in the administrative district of Gmina Jasień, within Żary County, Lubusz Voivodeship, in western Poland.
