= Stare Czaple =

Stare Czaple may refer to the following places:

- Stare Czaple, Lubusz Voivodeship (west Poland)
- Stare Czaple, Opole Voivodeship (south-west Poland)
- Stare Czaple, Pomeranian Voivodeship (north Poland)
