= Chudzowice =

- Village
- Location within Poland
- Coordinates: 51°39′N 14°53′E
- Country: Poland
- Voivodeship: Lubusz
- County: Żary
- Gmina: Trzebiel
- Population (approx.): 100

Chudzowice [xud͡zɔˈvit͡sɛ] is a village in the administrative district of Gmina Trzebiel, within Żary County, Lubusz Voivodeship, in western Poland, close to the German border.
