= Golin (disambiguation) =

Golin is a language of Papua New Guinea.

Golin may also refer to:

== Places ==
- Golin Allah Morad, a village in Kermanshah Province, Iran
- Golin, Iran, a village in Kurdistan Province, Iran
- Golin, Lubusz Voivodeship, Poland
- Golin, Myślibórz County, Poland
- Golin, Wałcz County, Poland

== People ==
- Ida Golin (1959–2025), Italian footballer
- Lino Golin (born 1945), Italian footballer
- Steve Golin (1955–2019), American film and television producer, founder and CEO of Anonymous Content LLP

== Other uses ==
- Golin (PR firm), a public relations firm
