= Guzów =

Guzów may refer to the following places in Poland:

- Guzów, Lubusz Voivodeship (west Poland)
- Guzów, Szydłowiec County in Masovian Voivodeship (east-central Poland)
- Guzów, Żyrardów County in Masovian Voivodeship (east-central Poland)
