= Lisia Góra, Lubusz Voivodeship =

Lisia Góra
- Village
- Location within Poland
- Coordinates: 51°44′0″N 14°59′47″E
- Country: Poland
- Voivodeship: Lubusz
- County: Żary
- Gmina: Jasień
- Population: 110

Lisia Góra [ˈliɕa ˈɡura] (Lower Sorbian: Lisija Góra; Upper Sorbian: Lisja Hora) is a village in the administrative district of Gmina Jasień, within Żary County, Lubusz Voivodeship, in western Poland.
