= Włostowice, Lubusz Voivodeship =

Włostowice
- Village
- Location within Poland
- Coordinates: 51°33′50″N 14°49′40″E
- Country: Poland
- Voivodeship: Lubusz
- County: Żary
- Gmina: Trzebiel

Włostowice [vwɔstɔˈvit͡sɛ] (German Roßnitz; Lower Sorbian: Rožnica) is a village in the administrative district of Gmina Trzebiel, within Żary County, Lubusz Voivodeship, in western Poland, close to the German border.
