= Jędrzychowiczki =

- Village
- Location within Poland
- Coordinates: 51°37′N 14°52′E
- Country: Poland
- Voivodeship: Lubusz
- County: Żary
- Gmina: Trzebiel

Jędrzychowiczki [jɛndʐɨxɔˈvit͡ʂki] (Upper Sorbian: Jědrzychowiczki) is a village in the administrative district of Gmina Trzebiel, within Żary County, Lubusz Voivodeship, in western Poland, close to the German border.
