= Zabłocie, Lubusz Voivodeship =

Zabłocie
- Village
- Location within Poland
- Coordinates: 51°47′N 15°7′E
- Country: Poland
- Voivodeship: Lubusz
- County: Żary
- Gmina: Jasień

Zabłocie [zaˈbwɔt͡ɕɛ] is a village in the administrative district of Gmina Jasień, within Żary County, Lubusz Voivodeship, in western Poland.
