= Zieleniec, Lubusz Voivodeship =

Zieleniec
- Village
- Location within Poland
- Coordinates: 51°43′N 14°59′E
- Country: Poland
- Voivodeship: Lubusz
- County: Żary
- Gmina: Jasień

Zieleniec [ʑɛˈlɛɲɛt͡s] (Lower Sorbian: Zaměriec; Upper Sorbian: Zielenjec) is a village in the administrative district of Gmina Jasień, within Żary County, Lubusz Voivodeship, in western Poland.
