= Lipsk Żarski =

- Village
- Location within Poland
- Coordinates: 51°41′N 15°1′E
- Country: Poland
- Voivodeship: Lubusz
- County: Żary
- Gmina: Jasień

Lipsk Żarski [ˈlipsk ˈʐarski] is a village in the administrative district of Gmina Jasień, within Żary County, Lubusz Voivodeship, in western Poland.
