= Wierzbięcin, Lubusz Voivodeship =

Wierzbięcin
- Village
- Location within Poland
- Coordinates: 51°32′50″N 14°50′30″E
- Country: Poland
- Voivodeship: Lubusz
- County: Żary
- Gmina: Trzebiel

Wierzbięcin [vjɛʐˈbjɛnt͡ɕin] (German Kochsdorf; Lower Sorbian: Wjerbjeńc) is a village in the administrative district of Gmina Trzebiel, within Żary County, Lubusz Voivodeship, in western Poland, close to the German border.

== See also ==
- Territorial changes of Poland after World War II
