= Budziechów =

- Village
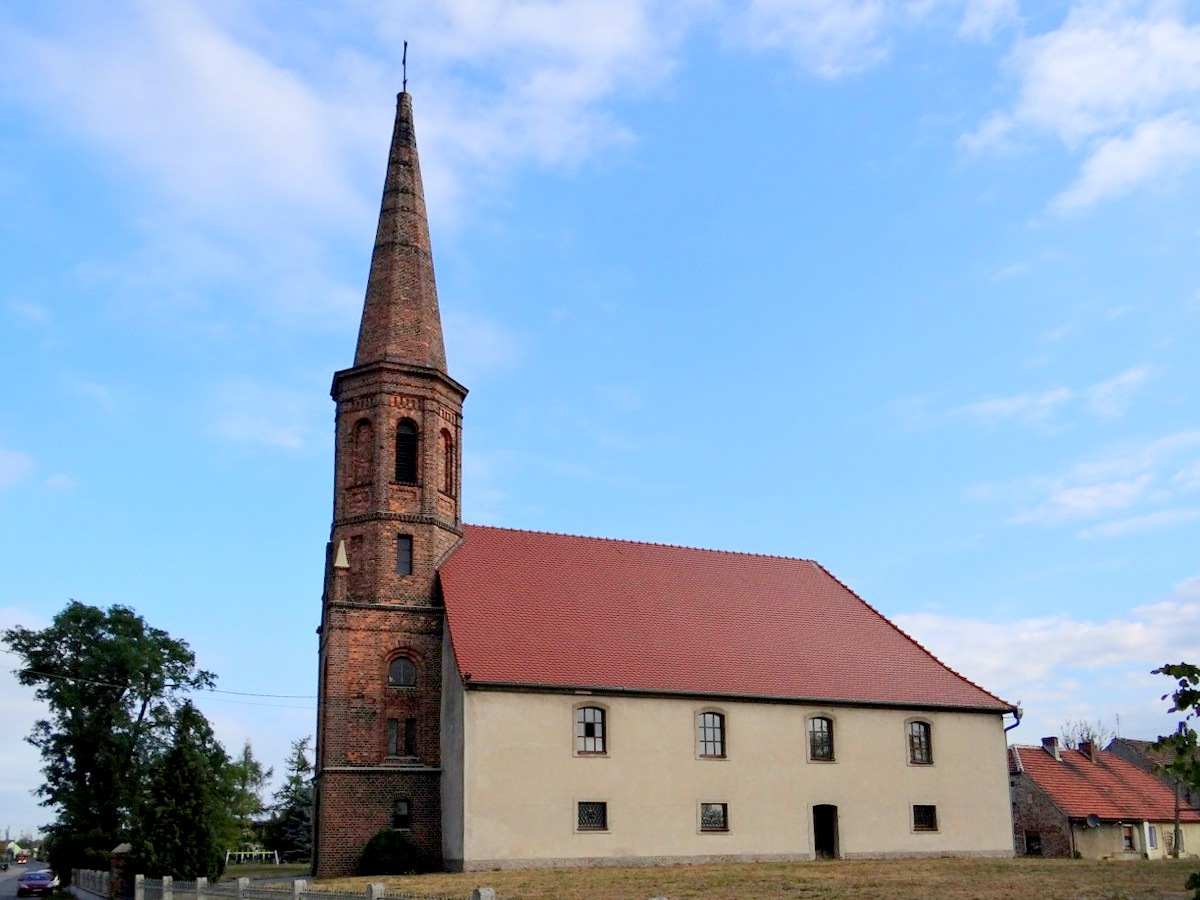
- Catholic church

- Location within Poland
- Coordinates: 51°46′29″N 14°59′32″E
- Country: Poland
- Voivodeship: Lubusz
- County: Żary
- Gmina: Jasień

Budziechów ([buˈd͡ʑɛxuf]; Lower Sorbian: Budźichow) is a village in the administrative district of Gmina Jasień, within Żary County, Lubusz Voivodeship, in western Poland.

== See also ==
Territorial changes of Poland after World War II
