= Siedlec, Lubusz Voivodeship =

Siedlec
- Village
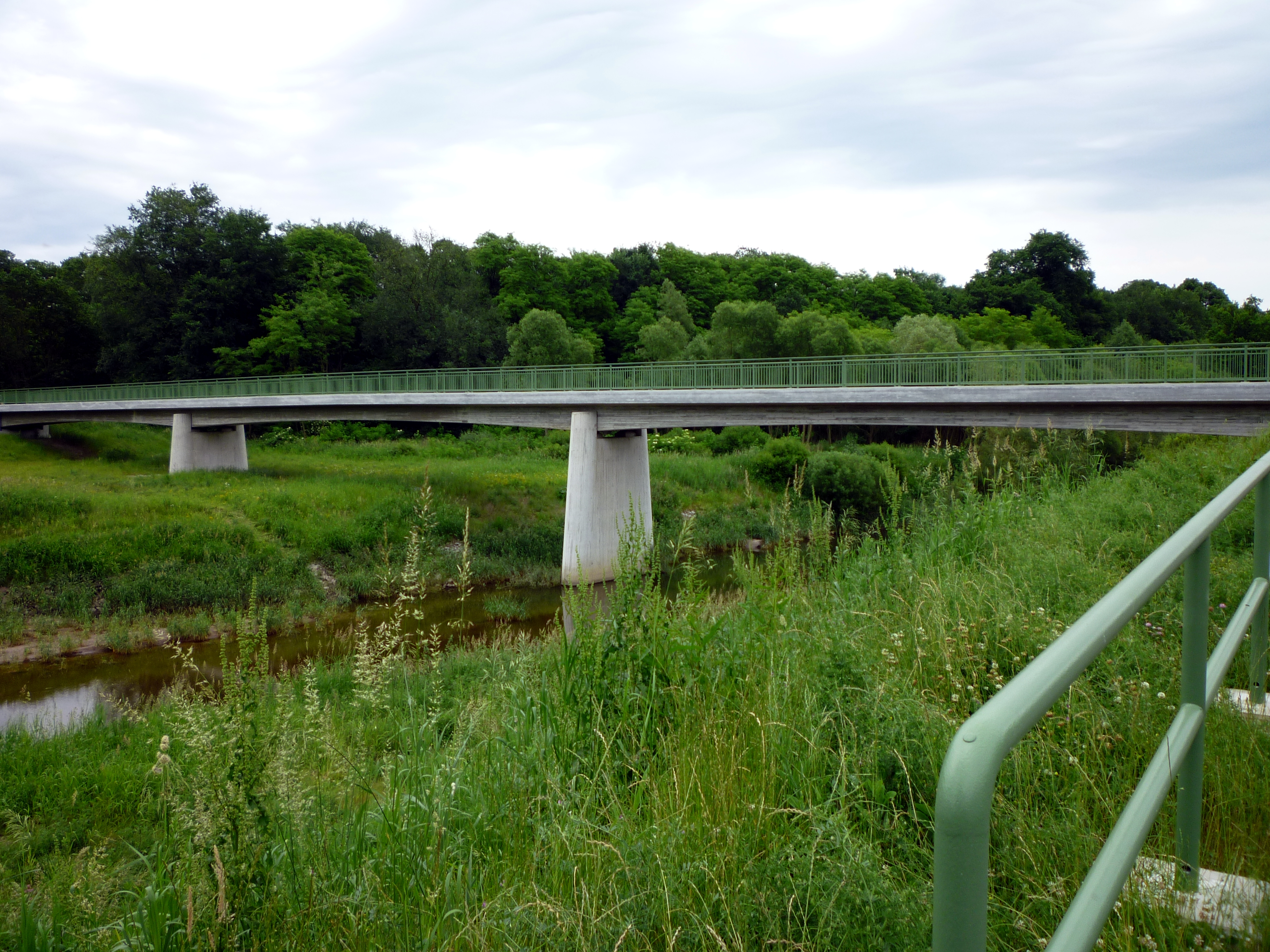
- Bridge

- Location within Poland
- Coordinates: 51°37′N 14°46′E
- Country: Poland
- Voivodeship: Lubusz
- County: Żary
- Gmina: Trzebiel

Siedlec [ˈɕɛdlɛt͡s] is a village in the administrative district of Gmina Trzebiel, within Żary County, Lubusz Voivodeship, in western Poland, close to the German border.
