= Muskau Park =

Riverside park on the German-Polish border

UNESCO World Heritage Site
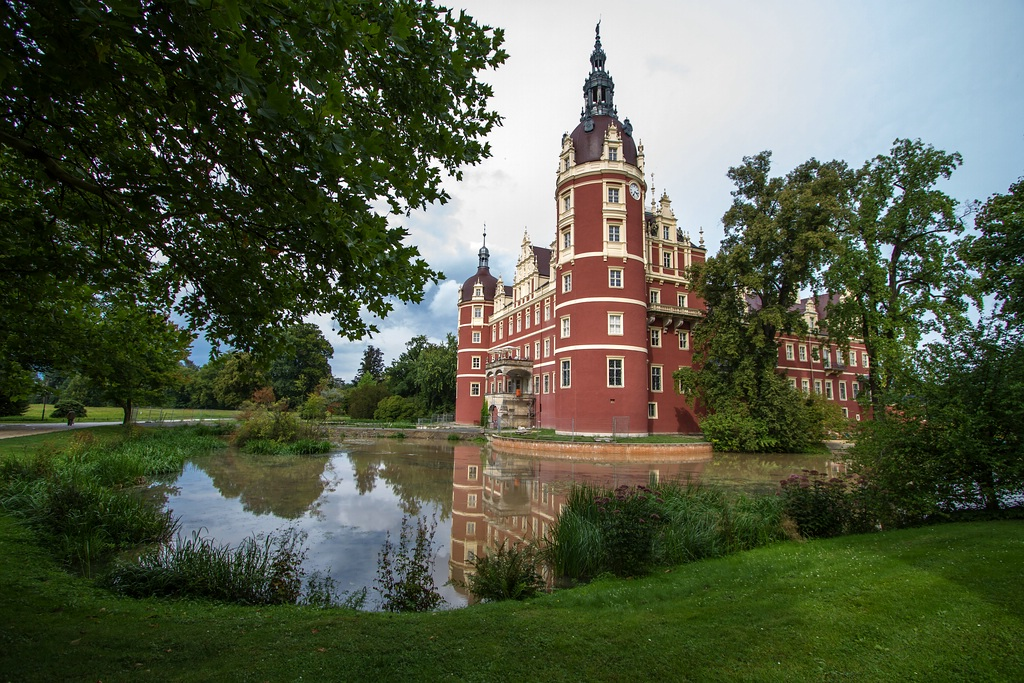

- Location within Saxony Location within Lubusz Voivodeship Location within Europe
- Location: Bad Muskau, Görlitz, Saxony, Germany, and Łęknica, Żary County, Lubusz Voivodeship, Poland; Historic region: Upper Lusatia
- Criteria: Cultural: (i), (iv)
- Reference: 1127
- Inscription: 2004 (28th Session)
- Area: 348 ha (860 acres)
- Buffer zone: 1,204.65 ha (2,976.8 acres)
- Website: www.muskauer-park.de
- Coordinates: 51°33′01″N 14°43′36″E

Muskau Park (German: Muskauer Park, officially: Fürst-Pückler-Park Bad Muskau; Polish: Park Mużakowski) is a landscape park in the Upper Lusatia region of Germany and Poland. It is the largest and one of the most famous English gardens in Central Europe, stretching along both sides of the German–Polish border on the Lusatian Neisse. The park was laid out from 1815 onwards at the behest of Prince Hermann von Pückler-Muskau (1785–1871), centered on his Schloss Muskau residence.

In July 2004, Muskau Park was added to the list of UNESCO World Heritage Sites (as a joint effort between Poland and Germany) because of its 'utopian' design that incorporates both native plants and the nearby town, and its influence on the development of landscape architecture. The park also stands as one of Poland's official Historic Monuments (pomnik historii), as designated on May 1, 2004, and tracked by the National Heritage Board of Poland.

== Overview ==
The park covers 3.5 square kilometers (860 acres) of land in Poland and 2.1 km^{2} (520 acres) in Germany. It extends on both sides of the Neisse, which constitutes the border between the countries. The 17.9 km^{2} (6.9 sq mi; 4,400 acres) buffer zone around the park encompassed the German town Bad Muskau (Upper Sorbian: Mužakow) in the West and Polish Łęknica (Wjeska, former Lugknitz) in the East. While Muskau Castle is situated west of the river, the heart of the park is the partially wooded raised area on the east bank called The Park on Terraces. In 2003, a pedestrian bridge spanning the Neisse was rebuilt to connect both parts. Designed as a painting with plants, the park uses native plants, water features, bridges, and paths to enhance the site's inherent natural beauty.

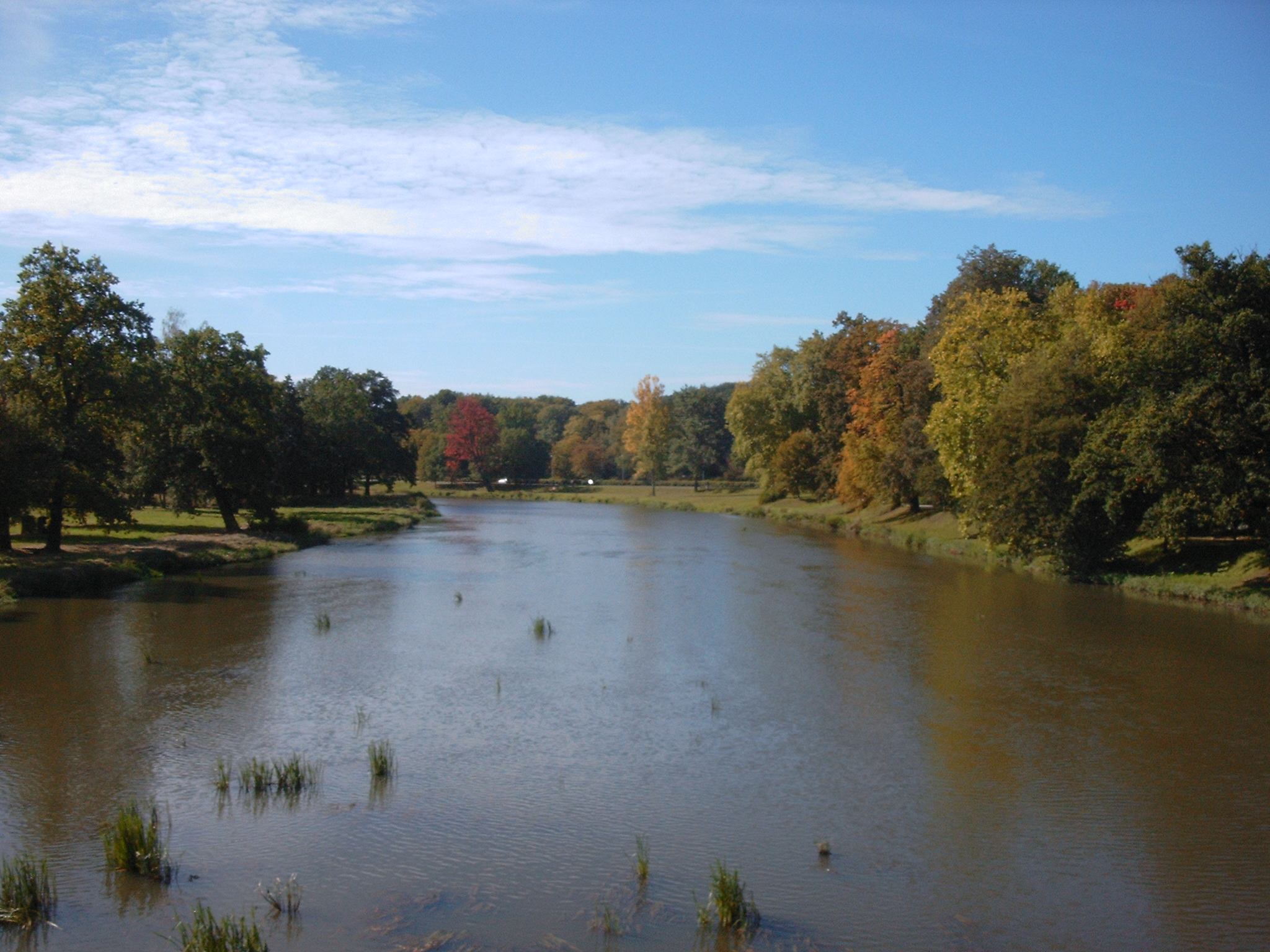
Neisse in Muskau Park

== History ==
A fortress on the Neisse at Muskau was first mentioned as early as the 13th century under the rule of Margrave Henry III of Meissen. The founder of the adjacent park was Prince Hermann von Pückler-Muskau (1785–1871), the author of the influential Remarks on Landscape Gardening and owner of the state country of Muskau from 1811. After prolonged studies in England, in 1815 during the time when the northeastern part of Upper Lusatia fell to Prussia, he laid out the Park. As time went by, he established an international school of landscape management in Bad Muskau and outlined the construction of an extensive landscape park which would envelop the town "in a way not done before on such a grand scale". His wife Lucie von Hardenberg also contributed to the park.

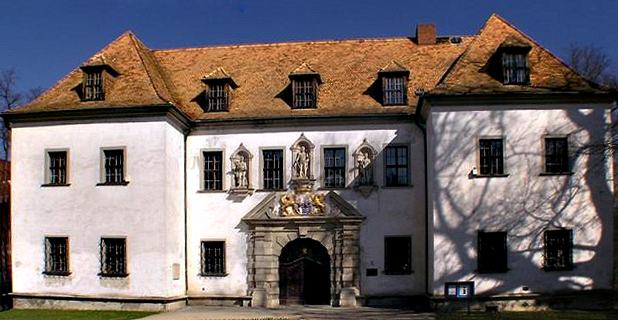
Old Castle

The works involved remodelling the Baroque "Old Castle" - actually a former castle gate - and the construction of a Gothic Revival chapel, an English cottage, several bridges, and an orangery designed by Friedrich Ludwig Persius. Pückler reconstructed the medieval fortress as the "New Castle", the compositional centre of the park, with a network of paths radiating from it and a pleasure ground influenced by the ideas of Humphry Repton, whose son John Adey Repton worked at Muskau from 1822 on. The extensions went on until 1845, when Pückler because of his enormous debts was constrained to sell the patrimony. The next year it was acquired by Prince Frederick of the Netherlands, who employed Eduard Petzold, Pückler's disciple and a well-known landscape gardener, to complete his design. Upon his death in 1881, he was succeeded by his daughter Princess Marie, who sold the estates to the Arnim family.

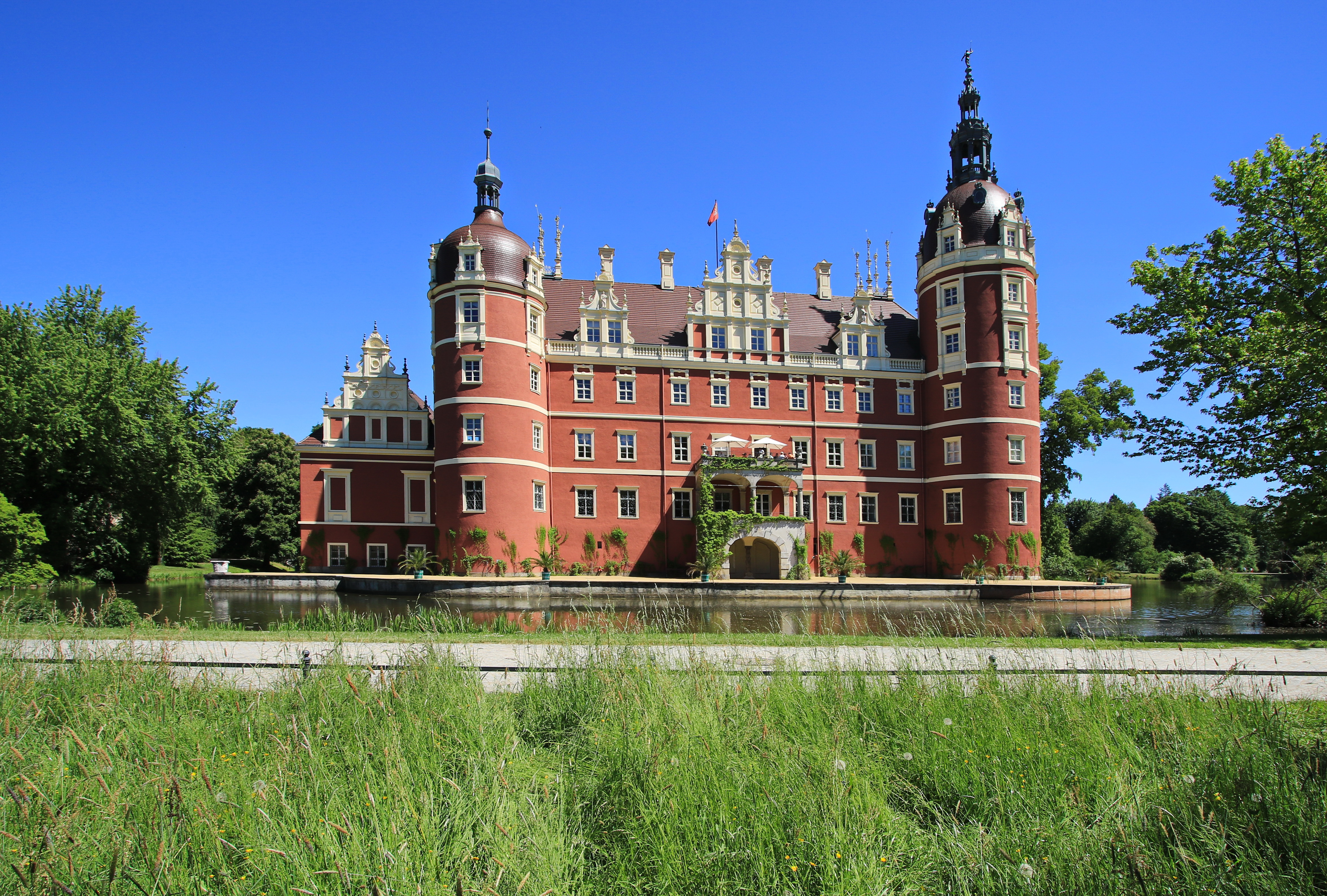
New Castle

During the Battle of Berlin, both castles were levelled and all four bridges across the Neisse were razed. Count von Arnim-Muskau was dispossessed by the Soviet Military Administration in Germany and since the implementation of the Oder-Neisse line in 1945, the park has been divided by the state border between Poland and Germany, with two thirds of it on the Polish side. Not until the 1960s did the authorities gradually accept the legacy of the "Junker" Prince Pückler. The Old Castle was rebuilt by the East German administration in 1965–1972, while the New Castle and the bridges are still being restored. The Englische Brücke ("English Bridge") across the River Neisse has been repaired and rededicated on 17 October 2011, after having been demolished with explosives in 1945.

After the Revolutions of 1989 the German and Polish administrations joined forces in the redevelopment of the park ensemble. Since Poland entered the Schengen Area in 2007, visitors may freely explore both parts of the park without border checks.

== Gallery ==
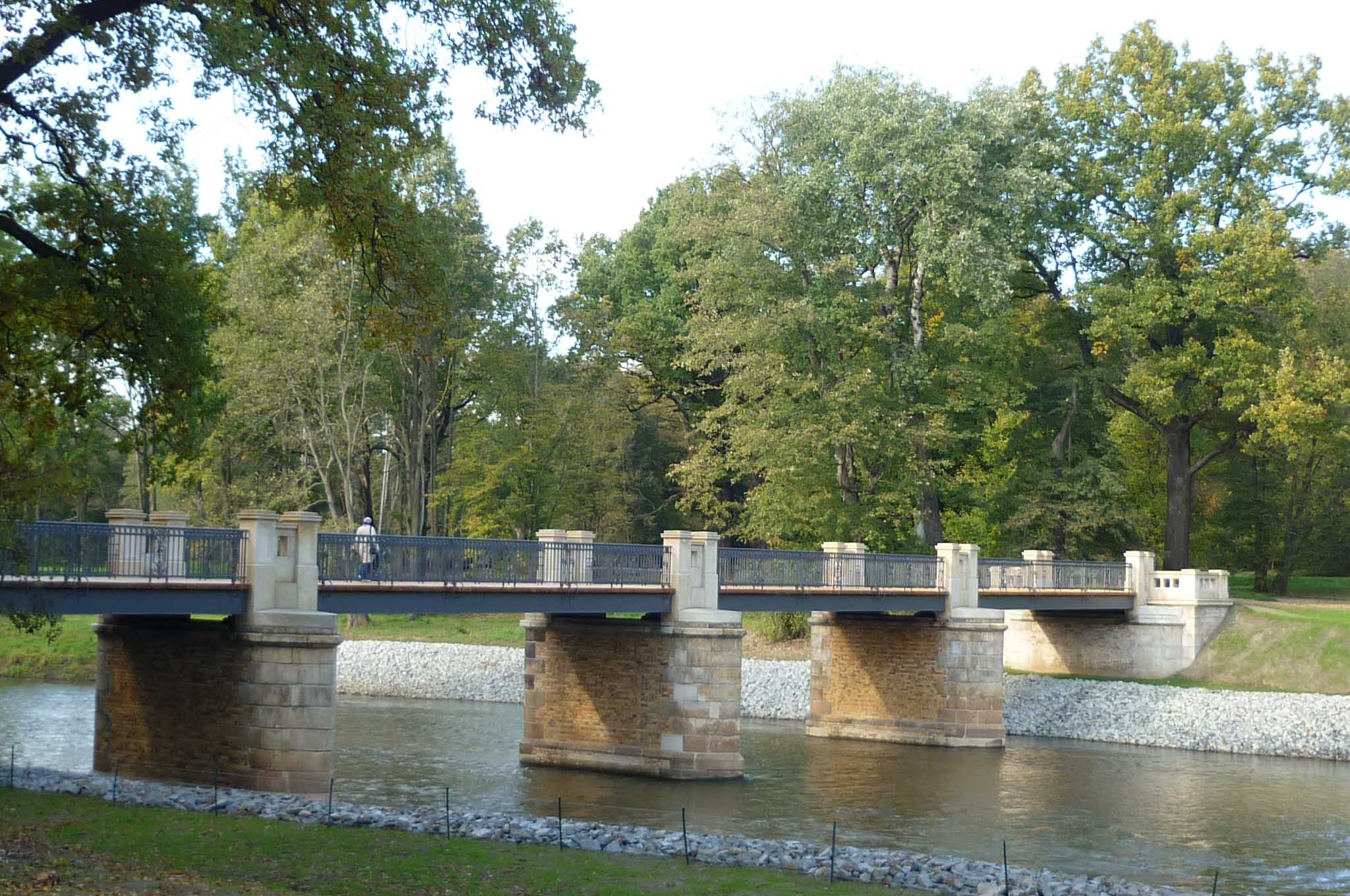
Englische Brücke (Germany in foreground, Poland in background)

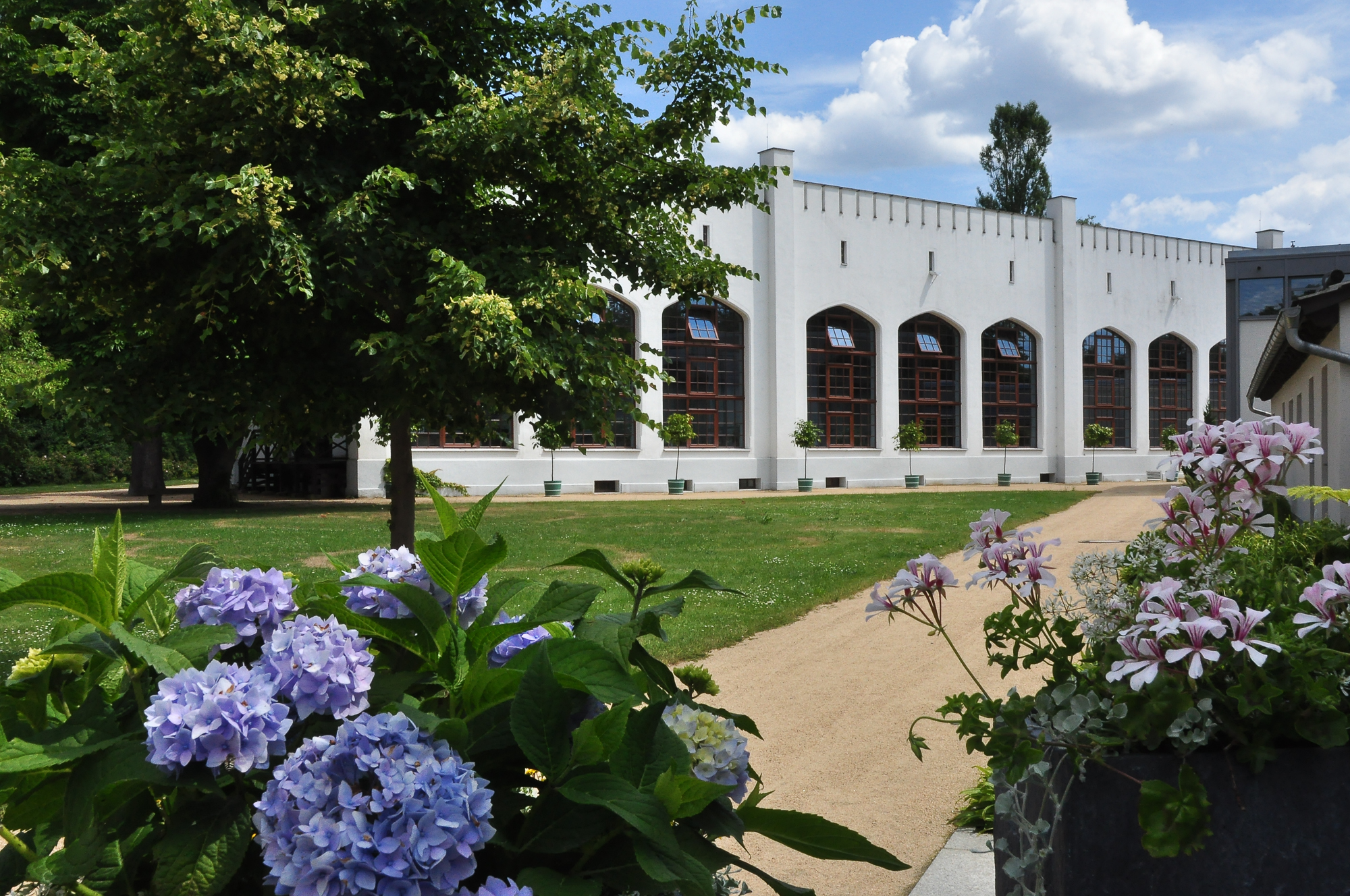
The orangery

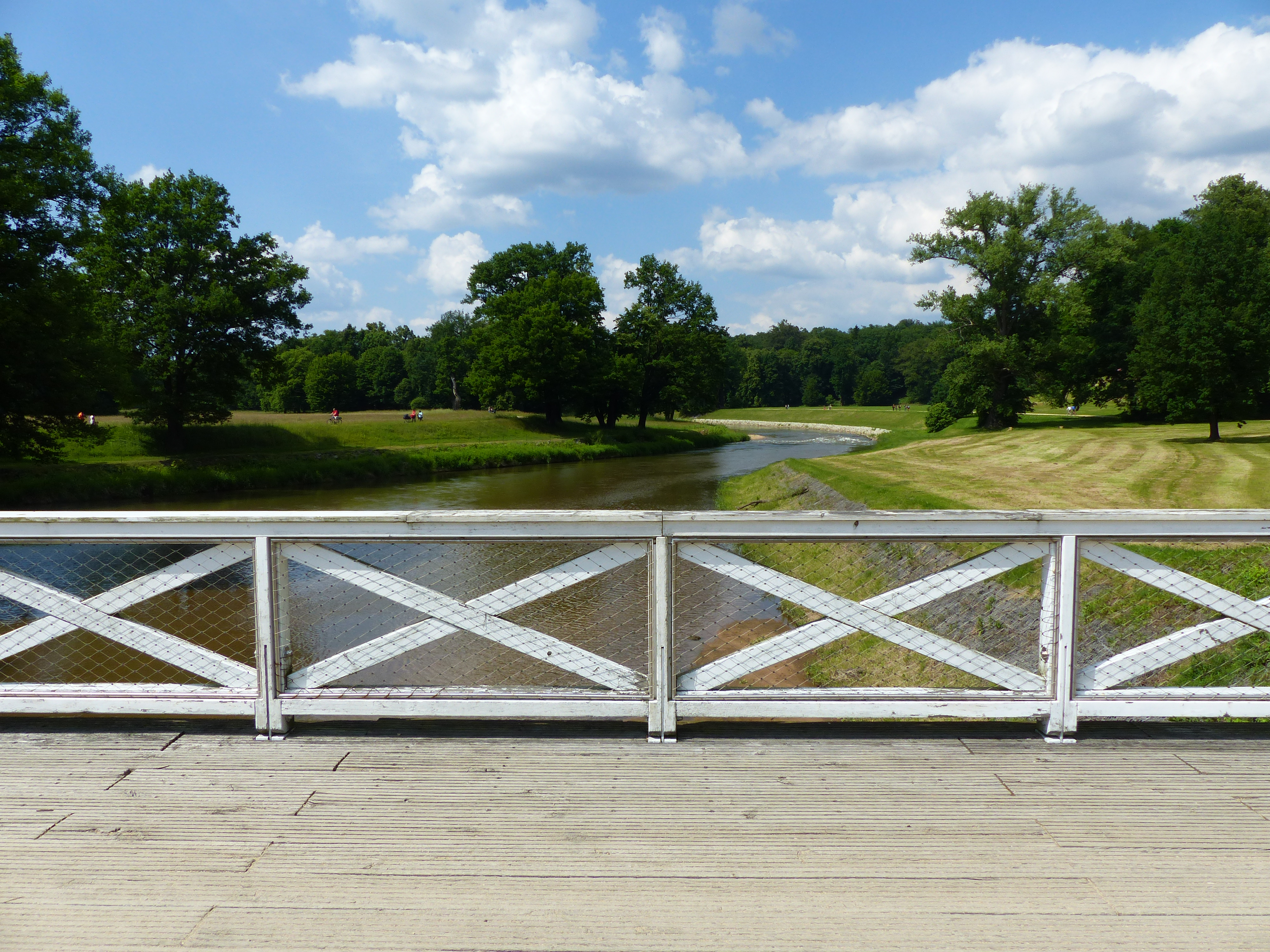

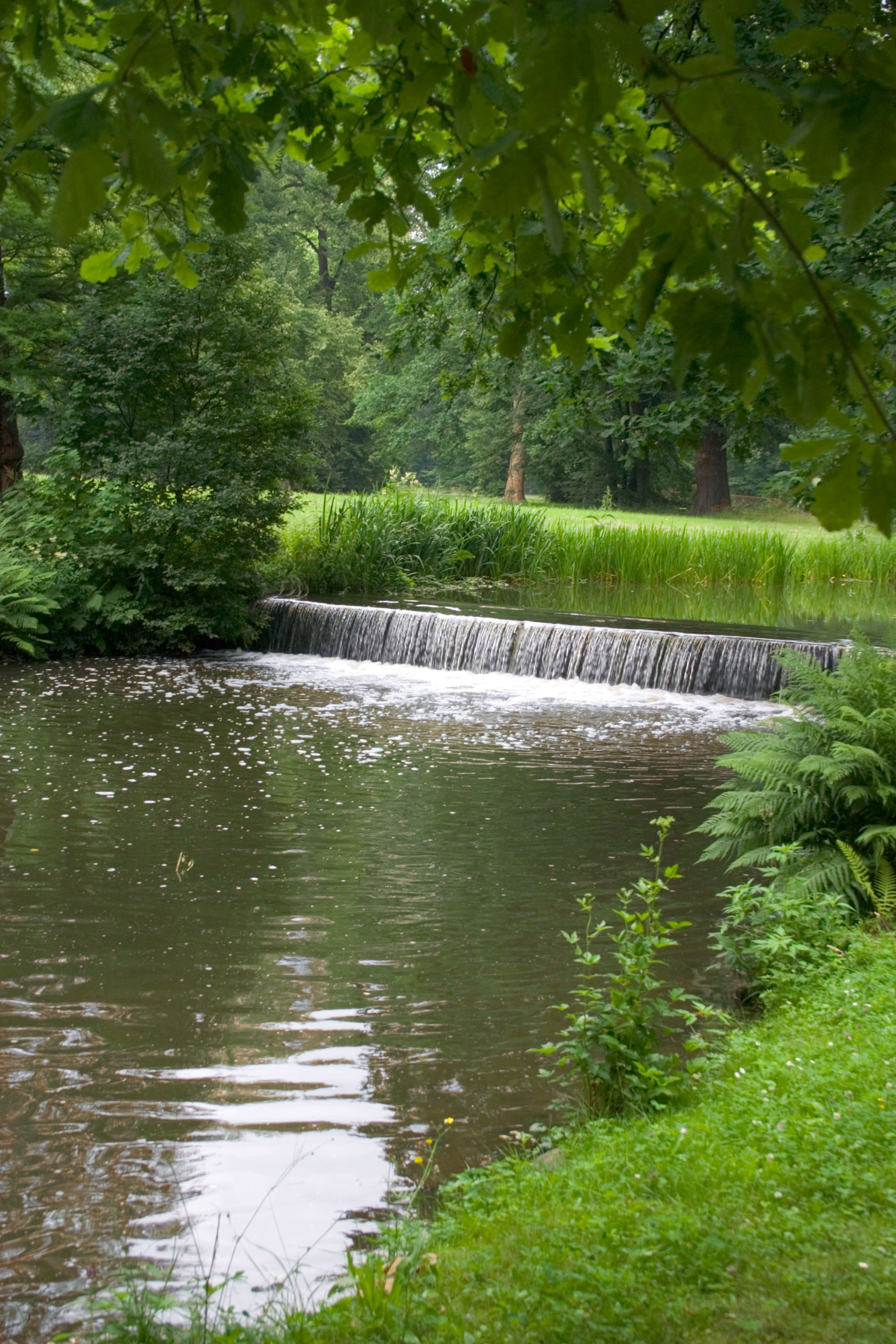

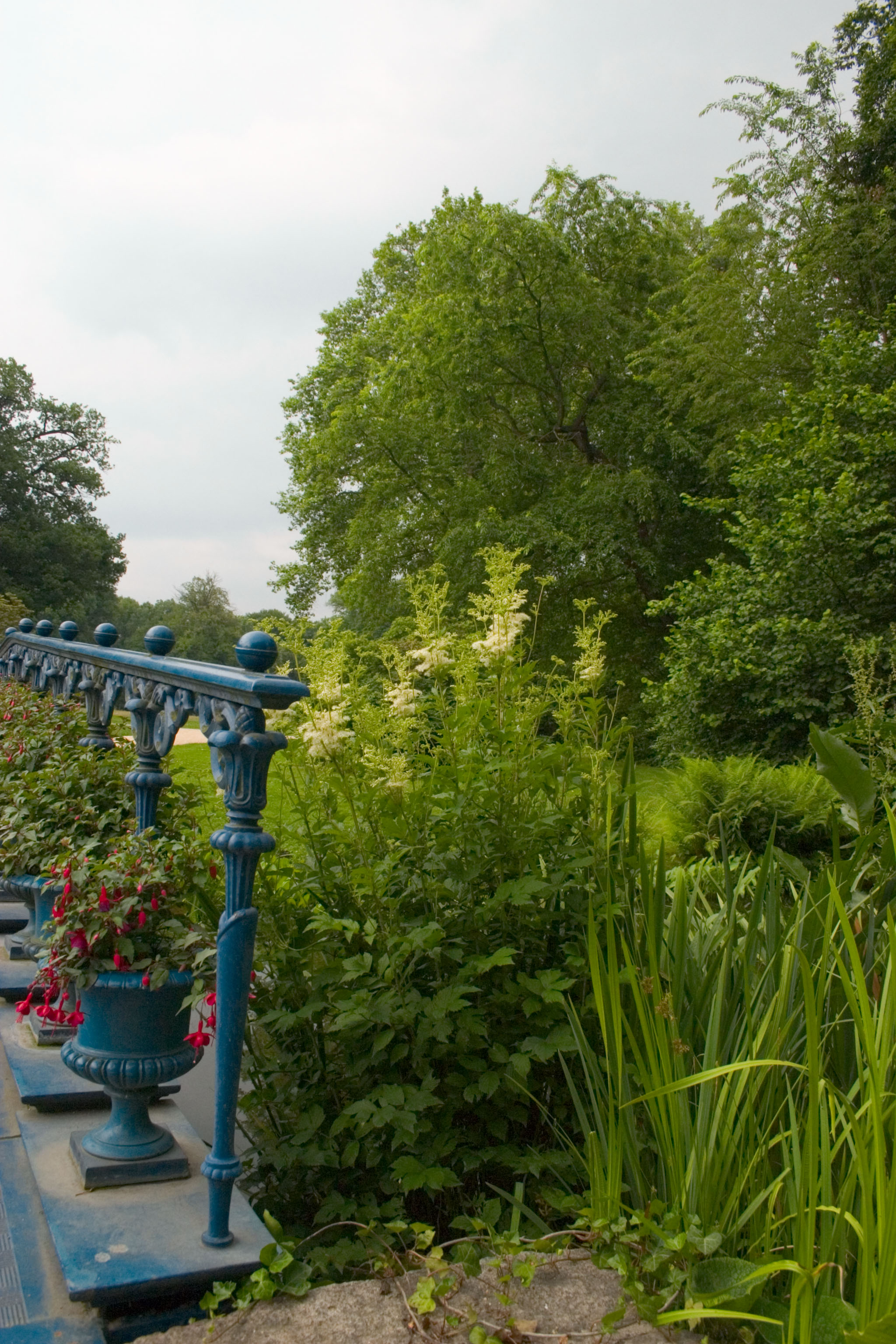
