= Kałki, Lubusz Voivodeship =

Kałki
- Village
- Location within Poland
- Coordinates: 51°39′N 14°47′E
- Country: Poland
- Voivodeship: Lubusz
- County: Żary
- Gmina: Trzebiel
- Time zone: UTC+1 (CET)
  - Summer (DST): UTC+2 (CEST)
- Vehicle registration: FZA

Kałki [ˈkau̯ki] (Lower Sorbian: Wuglu; Upper Sorbian: Wuhlik) is a village in the administrative district of Gmina Trzebiel, within Żary County, Lubusz Voivodeship, in western Poland, close to the German border.
