= Chwaliszowice =

- Village
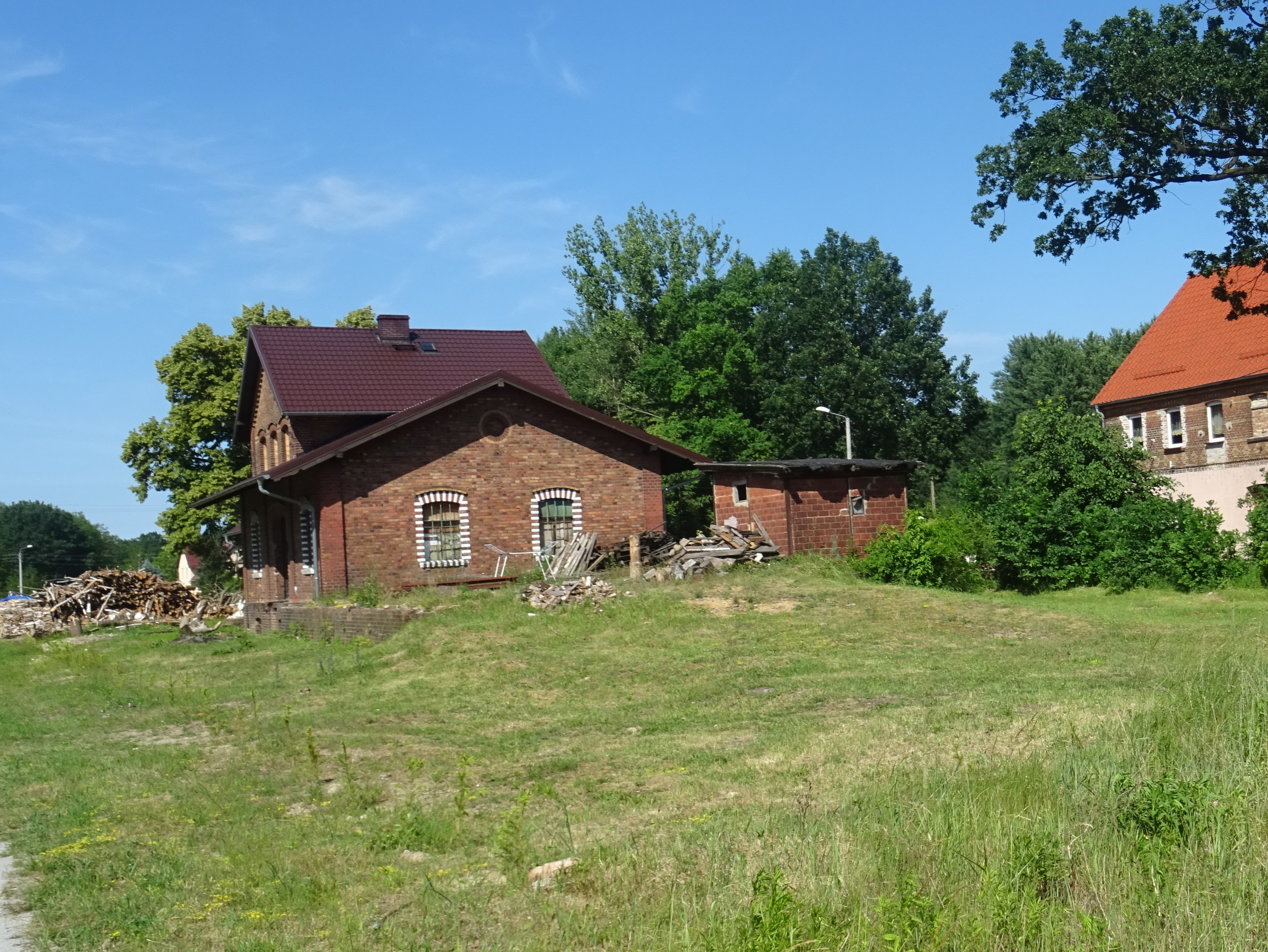

- Location within Poland
- Coordinates: 51°34′30″N 14°48′0″E
- Country: Poland
- Voivodeship: Lubusz
- County: Żary
- Gmina: Trzebiel
- Elevation: 47 m (154 ft)
- Time zone: UTC+1 (CET)
  - Summer (DST): UTC+2 (CEST)
- Vehicle registration: FZA

Chwaliszowice [xfaliʂɔˈvit͡sɛ] is a village in the administrative district of Gmina Trzebiel, within Żary County, Lubusz Voivodeship, in western Poland, close to the German border.

== Etymology ==
The name is of Slavic origin, and comes from word chwał.
