= Mirkowice, Lubusz Voivodeship =

Mirkowice
- Village
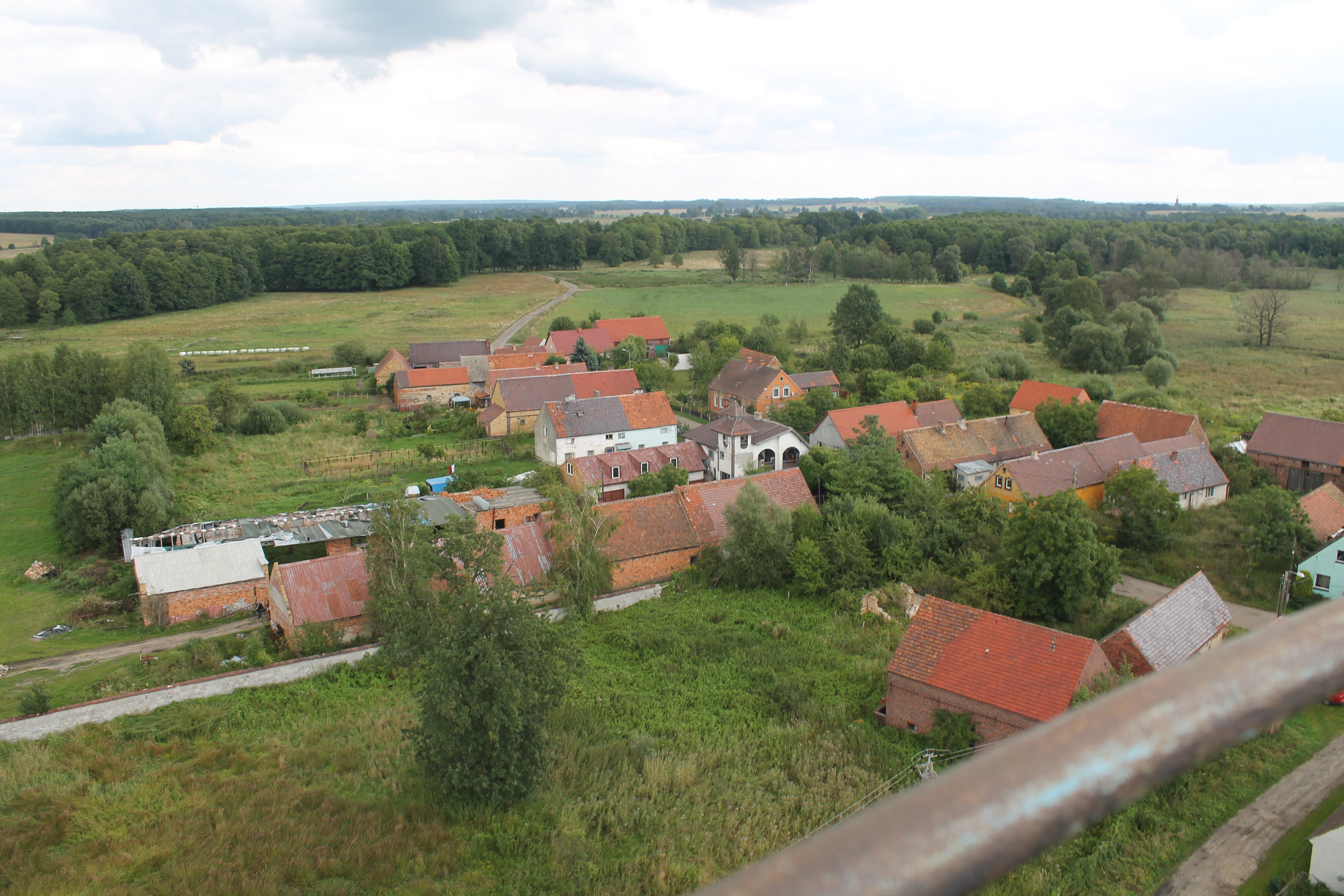

- Location within Poland
- Coordinates: 51°46′N 15°2′E
- Country: Poland
- Voivodeship: Lubusz
- County: Żary
- Gmina: Jasień

Mirkowice [mirkɔˈvit͡sɛ] is a village in the administrative district of Gmina Jasień, within Żary County, Lubusz Voivodeship, in western Poland.
