= Buczyny =

- Village
- Location within Poland
- Coordinates: 51°36′N 14°47′E
- Country: Poland
- Voivodeship: Lubusz
- County: Żary
- Gmina: Trzebiel

Buczyny ([buˈt͡ʂɨnɨ]; Lower Sorbian: Bukowe góle; Upper Sorbian: Bukowe lešy) is a village in the administrative district of Gmina Trzebiel, within Żary County, Lubusz Voivodeship, in western Poland, close to the German border.
