= Niwica, Żary County =

Niwica
- Village
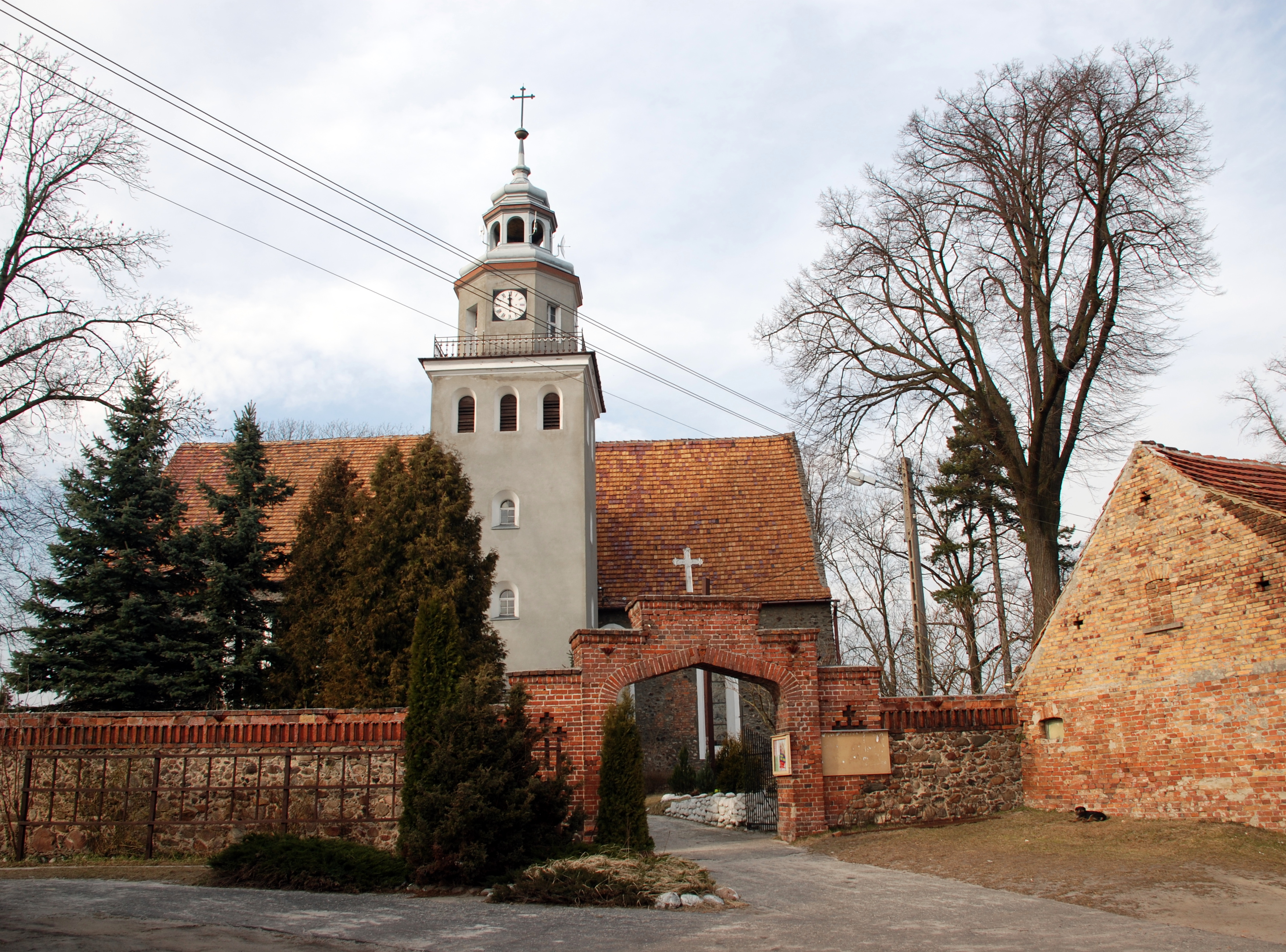
- Holy Trinity church in Niwica

- Location within Poland
- Coordinates: 51°34′55″N 14°50′35″E
- Country: Poland
- Voivodeship: Lubusz
- County: Żary
- Gmina: Trzebiel
- Postal code: 68-210

Niwica [niˈvit͡sa] is a village in the administrative district of Gmina Trzebiel, within Żary County, Lubusz Voivodeship, in western Poland, close to the German border.

In the past it was also known in Polish as Cybela. Sorbian church services were held in the village until 1811.

German scientist Walther Nernst died in the village in 1941.
