= Strzeszowice =

- Village
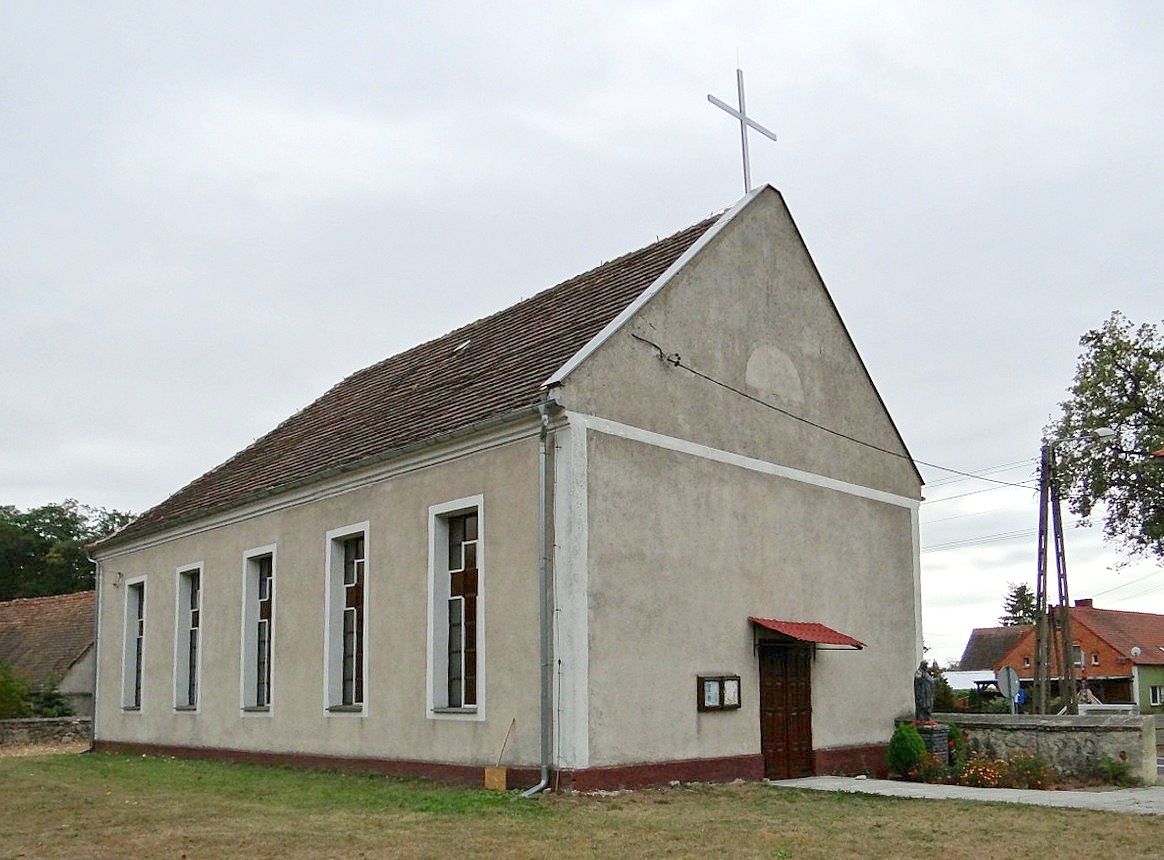
- Church

- Location within Poland
- Coordinates: 51°38′N 14°53′E
- Country: Poland
- Voivodeship: Lubusz
- County: Żary
- Gmina: Trzebiel

Strzeszowice [stʂɛʂɔˈvit͡sɛ] is a village in the administrative district of Gmina Trzebiel, within Żary County, Lubusz Voivodeship, in western Poland, close to the German border.

== See also ==
- Territorial changes of Poland after World War II
