= Jędrzychowice =

Jędrzychowice may refer to the following places in Poland:

- Jędrzychowice, Strzelin County in Lower Silesian Voivodeship (south-west Poland)
- Jędrzychowice, Zgorzelec County in Lower Silesian Voivodeship (south-west Poland)
- Jędrzychowice, Wschowa County in Lubusz Voivodeship (west Poland)
- Jędrzychowice, Żary County in Lubusz Voivodeship (west Poland)
