= Roztoki, Lubusz Voivodeship =

Roztoki
- Village
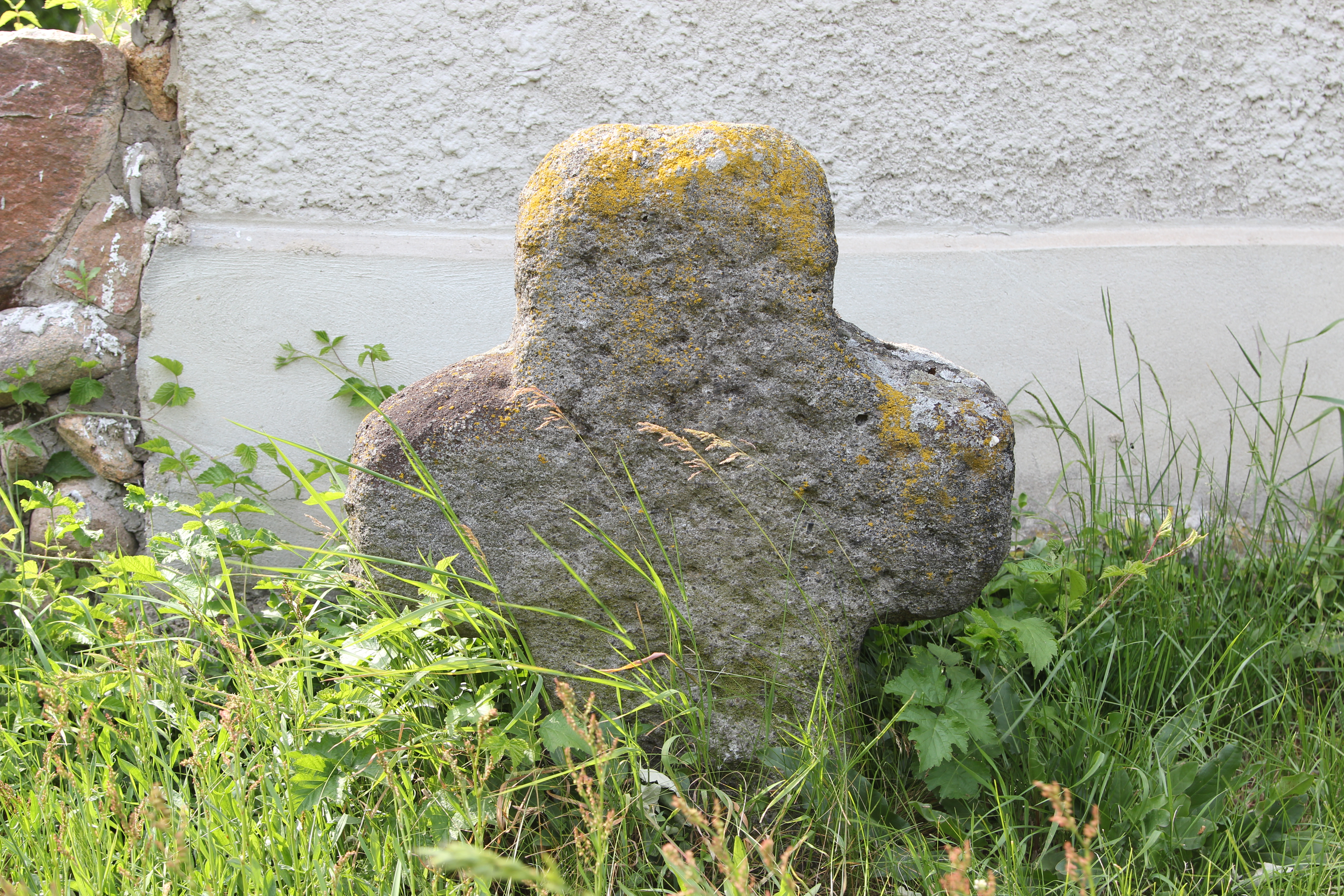
- Stone cross

- Location within Poland
- Coordinates: 51°45′N 15°4′E
- Country: Poland
- Voivodeship: Lubusz
- County: Żary
- Gmina: Jasień
- Population: 80

Roztoki [rɔsˈtɔki] is a village in the administrative district of Gmina Jasień, within Żary County, Lubusz Voivodeship, in western Poland.
