= Marcinów, Żary County =

Marcinów
- Village
- Location within Poland
- Coordinates: 51°33′34″N 14°51′54″E
- Country: Poland
- Voivodeship: Lubusz
- County: Żary
- Gmina: Trzebiel
- Population: 60 (2,005)

Marcinów [marˈt͡ɕinuf] (Lower Sorbian: Marcinow) is a village in the administrative district of Gmina Trzebiel, within Żary County, Lubusz Voivodeship, in western Poland, close to the German border.
