= Jurzyn, Żary County =

Jurzyn
- Village
- Location within Poland
- Coordinates: 51°43′12″N 14°55′48″E
- Country: Poland
- Voivodeship: Lubusz
- County: Żary
- Gmina: Jasień

Jurzyn [ˈjuʐɨn] is a village in the administrative district of Gmina Jasień, within Żary County, Lubusz Voivodeship, in western Poland.
