= Jasionna, Lubusz Voivodeship =

Jasionna
- Village
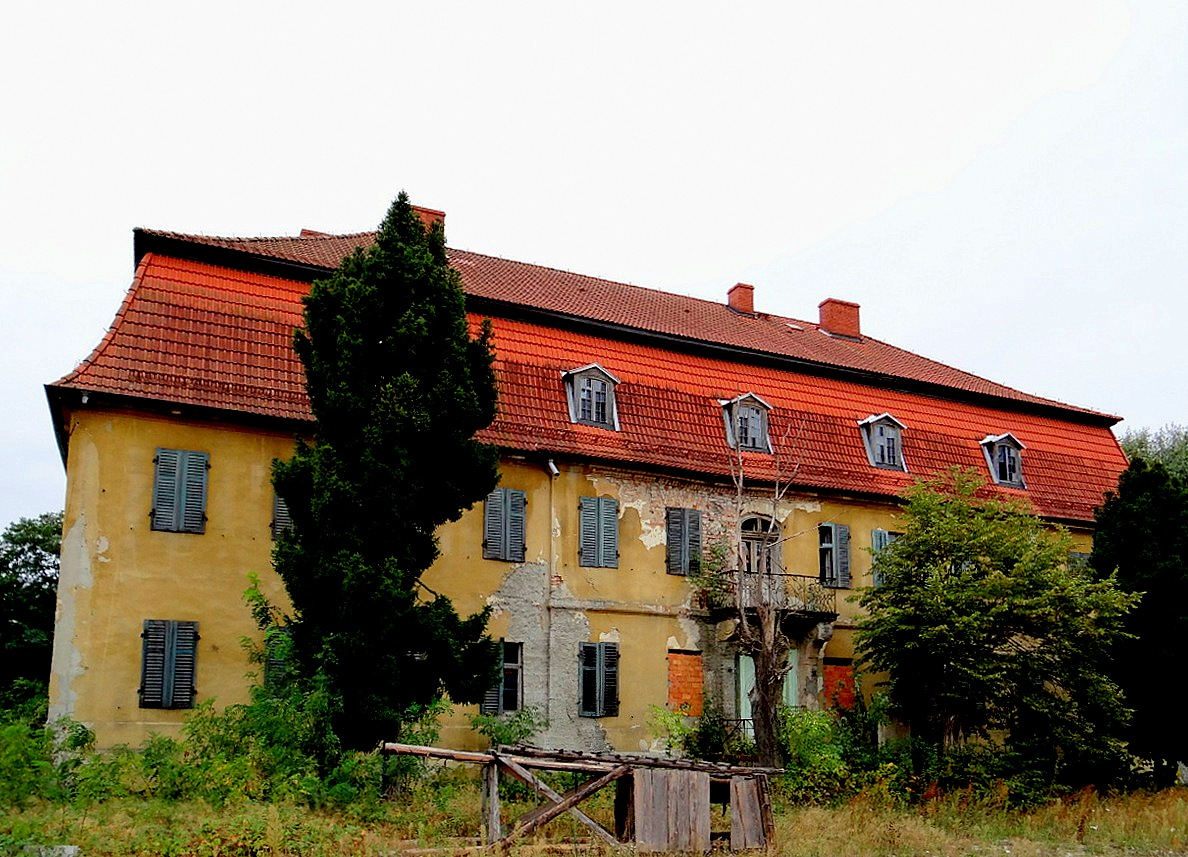
- Palace

- Location within Poland
- Coordinates: 51°43′N 14°57′E
- Country: Poland
- Voivodeship: Lubusz
- County: Żary
- Gmina: Jasień

Jasionna [jaˈɕɔnna] is a village in the administrative district of Gmina Jasień, within Żary County, Lubusz Voivodeship, in western Poland.
