= Jaryszów, Lubusz Voivodeship =

Jaryszów
- Village
- Location within Poland
- Coordinates: 51°41′40″N 14°59′41″E
- Country: Poland
- Voivodeship: Lubusz
- County: Żary
- Gmina: Jasień

Jaryszów [jaˈrɨʂuf] is a village in the administrative district of Gmina Jasień, within Żary County, Lubusz Voivodeship, in western Poland.
