= Golin, Lubusz Voivodeship =

Golin
- Village
- Location within Poland
- Coordinates: 51°03′04″N 14°59′32.2″E
- Country: Poland
- Voivodeship: Lubusz
- County: Żary
- Gmina: Jasień

Golin [ˈɡɔlin] is a village in the administrative district of Gmina Jasień, within Żary County, Lubusz Voivodeship, in western Poland.
