= Jasień, Lubusz Voivodeship =

Jasień
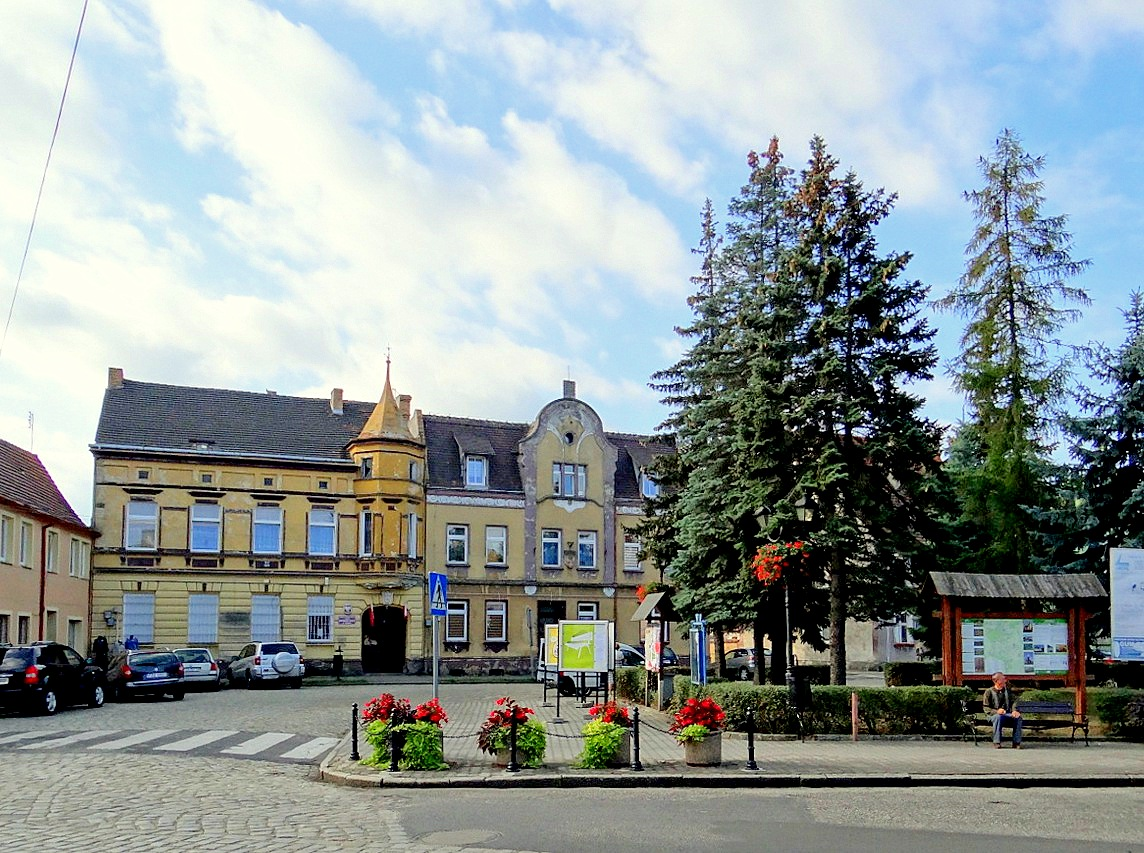
- Rynek (Market Square)

- Coat of arms

- Location within Poland
- Coordinates: 51°45′5″N 15°1′3″E
- Country: Poland
- Voivodeship: Lubusz
- County: Żary
- Gmina: Jasień
- First mentioned: 1000
- Town rights: 1660

Area
  - Total: 3.05 km^{2} (1.18 sq mi)

Population (2019-06-30)
  - Total: 4,309
  - Density: 1,410/km^{2} (3,660/sq mi)
- Time zone: UTC+1 (CET)
  - Summer (DST): UTC+2 (CEST)
- Postal code: 68-320
- Vehicle registration: FZA
- Climate: Cfb
- Website: http://www.jasien.com.pl

Jasień [ˈjaɕɛɲ] (German: Gassen) is a town in western Poland, in Lubusz Voivodeship, in Żary County. It has 4,309 inhabitants (2019).

== History ==
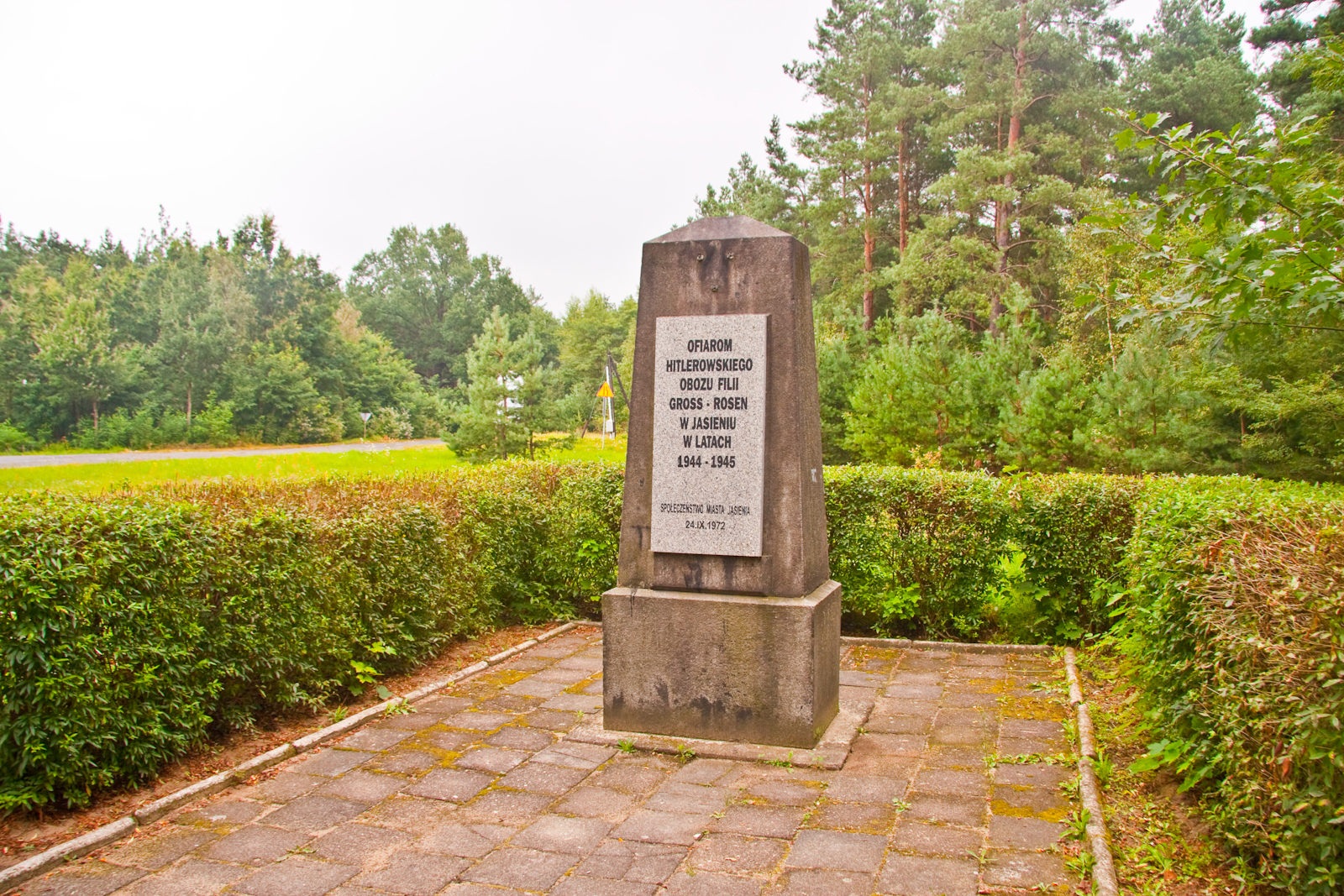
Memorial to the victims of the subcamp of the Gross-Rosen concentration camp

During World War II Jasień was the location of the Nazi German slave labour camp AL Gassen, one of nearly one hundred subcamps of the Gross-Rosen concentration camp. Its prisoners, mostly Poles, but also Soviet prisoners of war, Czechs, Croats, Frenchmen, Romanians, Italians, Hungarians, Greeks, Serbs, Lithuanians, were making warplane parts for Focke-Wulf AG. The camp, with around 700 acutely malnourished prisoners, operated from August 1944 until 13 February 1945, when the remaining workforce was sent on a death march to the Buchenwald concentration camp ahead of the Soviet advance.

== Demographics ==
Historical population

Year	Pop.	±%
1890	2,755	—
1900	2,786	+1.1%
1910	3,829	+37.4%
1925	3,549	−7.3%

Year	Pop.	±%
1939	3,186	−10.2%
1950	1,541	−51.6%
1960	3,501	+127.2%
2010	4,376	+25.0%

== Sports ==
The local football club is Stal Jasień. It competes in the lower leagues.

== Twin towns – sister cities ==
See twin towns of Gmina Jasień.
