= Jędrzychowice, Żary County =

Jędrzychowice
- Village
- Location within Poland
- Coordinates: 51°36′42″N 14°54′14″E
- Country: Poland
- Voivodeship: Lubusz
- County: Żary
- Gmina: Trzebiel

Jędrzychowice [jɛndʐɨxɔˈvit͡sɛ] (German: Hennersdorf; Lower Sorbian: Jědrzychowice) is a village in the administrative district of Gmina Trzebiel, within Żary County, Lubusz Voivodeship, in western Poland, close to the German border.
