= Gmina Jasień =

Gmina Jasień Jasień Commune
- Gmina
- Coat of arms
- Interactive map of Gmina Jasień
- Coordinates (Jasień): 51°45′5″N 15°1′3″E
- Country: Poland
- Voivodeship: Lubusz
- County: Żary
- Seat: Jasień

Area
  - Total: 127.02 km^{2} (49.04 sq mi)

Population (2019-06-30)
  - Total: 7,040
  - Density: 55.4/km^{2} (144/sq mi)
  - Urban: 4,309
  - Rural: 2,731
- Website: http://www.jasien.com.pl

Gmina Jasień is an urban-rural gmina (administrative district) in Żary County, Lubusz Voivodeship, in western Poland. Its seat is the town of Jasień, which lies approximately 16 kilometres (10 mi) north-west of Żary and 40 km (25 mi) south-west of Zielona Góra.

The gmina covers an area of 127.02 square kilometres (49.0 sq mi), and as of 2019 its total population was 7,040.

== Villages ==
Apart from the town of Jasień, Gmina Jasień contains the villages and settlements of Bieszków, Bronice, Budziechów, Golin, Guzów, Jabłoniec, Jaryszów, Jasionna, Jurzyn, Lipsk Żarski, Lisia Góra, Mirkowice, Roztoki, Świbna, Wicina, Zabłocie and Zieleniec.

== Neighbouring gminas ==
Gmina Jasień is bordered by the gminas of Lipinki Łużyckie, Lubsko, Nowogród Bobrzański, Tuplice and Żary.

== Twin towns – sister cities ==
Gmina Jasień is twinned with:

- Spreetal, Germany
