= Bogaczów, Żary County =

Bogaczów
- Village
- Location within Poland
- Coordinates: 51°37′16″N 14°50′27″E
- Country: Poland
- Voivodeship: Lubusz
- County: Żary
- Gmina: Trzebiel
- Population: 20

Bogaczów ([bɔˈɡat͡ʂuf]; Lower Sorbian: Bogaczow) is a village in the administrative district of Gmina Trzebiel, within Żary County, Lubusz Voivodeship, in western Poland, close to the German border.
