= Stare Czaple, Lubusz Voivodeship =

Stare Czaple
- Village
- Location within Poland
- Coordinates: 51°33′18″N 14°46′27″E
- Country: Poland
- Voivodeship: Lubusz
- County: Żary
- Gmina: Trzebiel
- Time zone: UTC+1 (CET)
  - Summer (DST): UTC+2 (CEST)
- Postal code: 68-210
- Vehicle registration: FZA

Stare Czaple [ˈstarɛ ˈt͡ʂaplɛ] (Lower Sorbian: Stary Rěd; Upper Sorbian: Stary Rjadowar) is a village in the administrative district of Gmina Trzebiel, within Żary County, Lubusz Voivodeship, in western Poland, close to the German border.
