= Gmina Trzebiel =

Gmina Trzebiel Trzebiel Commune
- Gmina
- Coat of arms
- Interactive map of Gmina Trzebiel
- Coordinates (Trzebiel): 51°38′9″N 14°48′59″E
- Country: Poland
- Voivodeship: Lubusz
- County: Żary
- Seat: Trzebiel

Area
  - Total: 166.59 km^{2} (64.32 sq mi)

Population (2019-06-30)
  - Total: 5,679
  - Density: 34.09/km^{2} (88.29/sq mi)
- Website: http://www.trzebiel.pl

Gmina Trzebiel is a rural gmina (administrative district) in Żary County, Lubusz Voivodeship, in western Poland, on the German border. Its seat is the village of Trzebiel, which lies approximately 22 kilometres (14 mi) west of Żary and 59 km (37 mi) south-west of Zielona Góra.

The gmina covers an area of 166.59 square kilometres (64.3 sq mi), and as of 2019 its total population is 5,679.

The gmina contains part of the protected area called Muskau Bend Landscape Park.

== Villages ==
Gmina Trzebiel contains the villages and settlements of Bogaczów, Bronowice, Buczyny, Bukowina, Chudzowice, Chwaliszowice, Czaple, Dębinka, Gniewoszyce, Jasionów, Jędrzychowice, Jędrzychowiczki, Kałki, Kamienica nad Nysą Łużycką, Karsówka, Królów, Łuków, Marcinów, Mieszków, Niwica, Nowe Czaple, Olszyna, Przewoźniki, Pustków, Rytwiny, Siedlec, Siemiradz, Stare Czaple, Strzeszowice, Trzebiel, Wierzbięcin, Włostowice, Żarki Małe and Żarki Wielkie.

== Neighbouring gminas ==
Gmina Trzebiel is bordered by the town of Łęknica and by the gminas of Brody, Lipinki Łużyckie, Przewóz and Tuplice. It also borders Germany.

== Twin towns – sister cities ==
Gmina Trzebiel is twinned with:

- Lázně Libverda, Czech Republic
- Neiße-Malxetal, Germany
