= Królów =

- Village
- Location within Poland
- Coordinates: 51°38′N 14°51′E
- Country: Poland
- Voivodeship: Lubusz
- County: Żary
- Gmina: Trzebiel
- Population: 100

Królów [ˈkruluf] (Lower Sorbian: Krale; Upper Sorbian: Kralojo) is a village in the administrative district of Gmina Trzebiel, within Żary County, Lubusz Voivodeship, in western Poland, close to the German border.
