= Trzebiel =

- Village
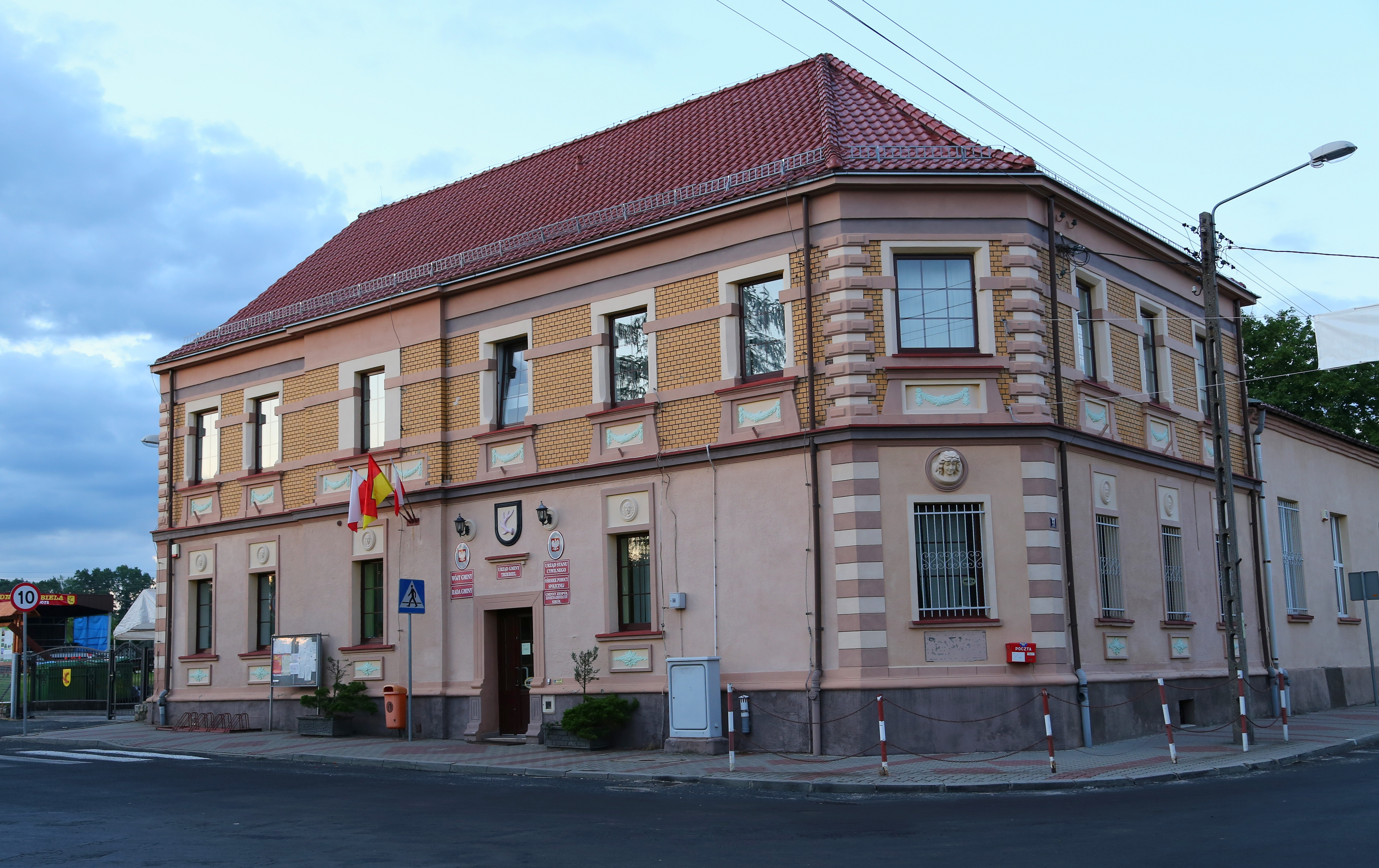
- Gmina office

- Location within Poland
- Coordinates: 51°38′9″N 14°48′59″E
- Country: Poland
- Voivodeship: Lubusz
- County: Żary
- Gmina: Trzebiel
- First mentioned: 1301

Population (approx.)
  - Total: 1,400
- Time zone: UTC+1 (CET)
  - Summer (DST): UTC+2 (CEST)
- Vehicle registration: FZA

Trzebiel ([ˈtʂɛbjɛl]) (Lower Sorbian: Trjebule) is a village in Żary County, Lubusz Voivodeship, in western Poland, close to the German border. It is the seat of the gmina (administrative district) called Gmina Trzebiel.

== History ==
The settlement was first mentioned in a 1301 deed, then part of the March of Lusatia and the settlement area of the Sorbs. Located within the historical region of Lower Lusatia, the border with Upper Lusatia—the state country of Muskau—ran just a few miles south of the village. It was part of the Duchy of Jawor, the southwesternmost duchy of fragmented Piast-ruled Poland, until 1346 and afterwards it was ruled by Czech kings, Hungarian kings, Saxon electors and Polish kings. In the Late Middle Ages, it was located at the intersection of important east-west and north-south trade routes. A route connecting Warsaw and Poznań with Dresden ran through the settlement in the 18th century and King Augustus III of Poland often traveled that route. In 1815, it was annexed by Prussia, and from 1871 to 1945 it was part of Germany, before being reintegrated with Poland after Nazi Germany's defeat in World War II.

Until 1998 it belonged to former Zielona Góra Voivodeship.

There is a Catholic church of Our Lady Queen of Poland in the village.

== Notable people ==
- Jan Benedykt Solfa (1483–1564), court doctor of Polish kings
