= Pustków, Lubusz Voivodeship =

Pustków
- Village
- Location within Poland
- Coordinates: 51°34′06″N 14°46′07″E
- Country: Poland
- Voivodeship: Lubusz
- County: Żary
- Gmina: Trzebiel

Pustków [ˈpustkuf] (Lower Sorbian: Prozne Rumy; Upper Sorbian: Prózdne Rumnosće) is a village in the administrative district of Gmina Trzebiel, within Żary County, Lubusz Voivodeship, in western Poland, close to the German border.
