= Guzów, Lubusz Voivodeship =

Guzów
- Village
- Location within Poland
- Coordinates: 51°46′N 15°6′E
- Country: Poland
- Voivodeship: Lubusz
- County: Żary
- Gmina: Jasień

Guzów [ˈɡuzuf] (Lower Sorbian: Tumoren) is a village in the administrative district of Gmina Jasień, within Żary County, Lubusz Voivodeship, in western Poland.
