= Bronowice, Żary County =

Bronowice
- Village
- Location within Poland
- Coordinates: 51°33′36″N 14°45′39″E
- Country: Poland
- Voivodeship: Lubusz
- County: Żary
- Gmina: Trzebiel
- Population: 370

Bronowice ([brɔnɔˈvit͡sɛ]) is a village in the administrative district of Gmina Trzebiel, within Żary County, Lubusz Voivodeship, in western Poland, close to the German border.

In the 1880s, most inhabitants spoke Sorbian.

== See also ==
- Territorial changes of Poland after World War II
