= Łęknica =

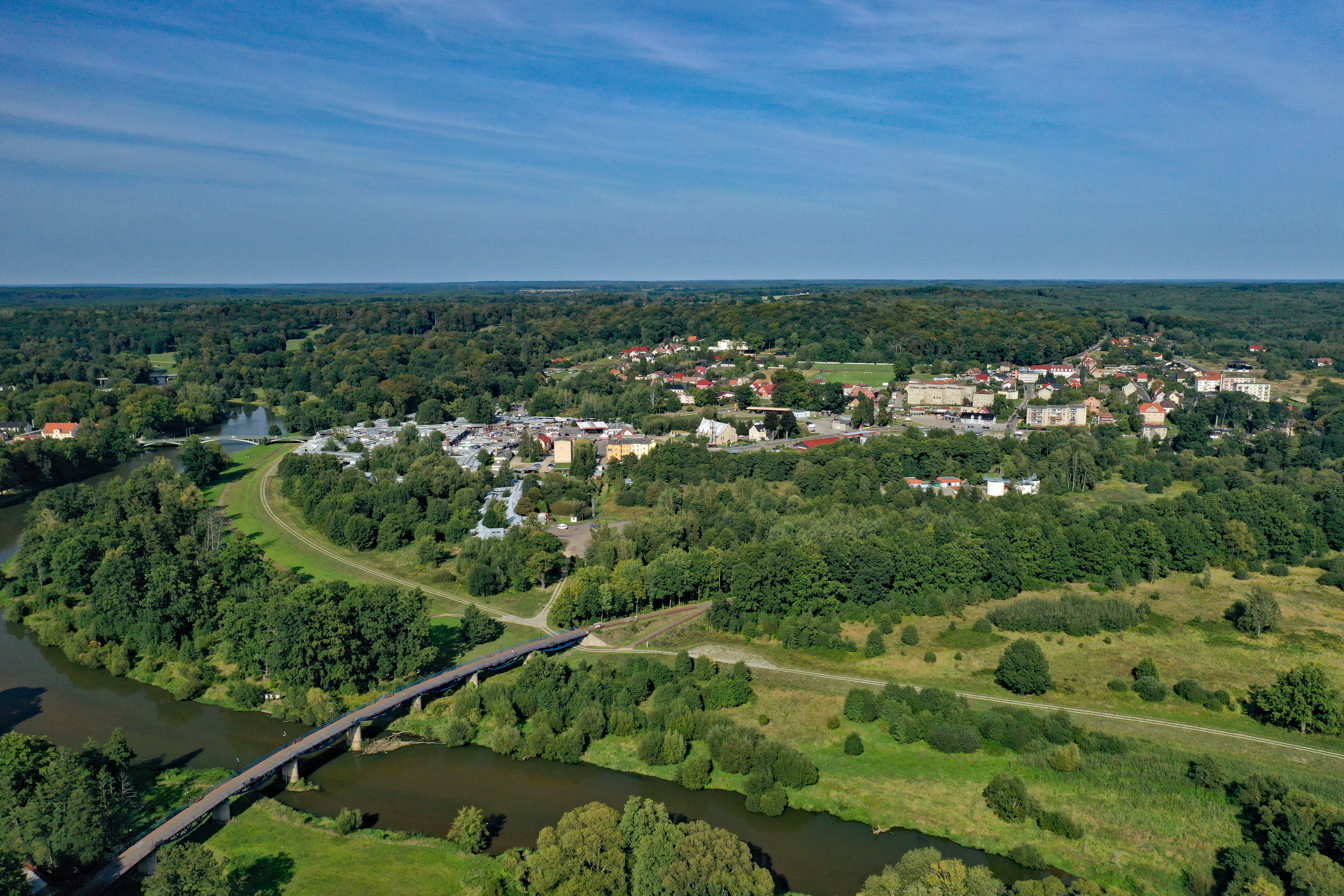
- Aerial view of Łęknica

- Flag Coat of arms

- Location within Poland
- Coordinates: 51°32′18″N 14°44′21″E
- Country: Poland
- Voivodeship: Lubusz
- County: Żary
- Gmina: Łęknica (urban gmina)
- Town rights: 1969

Area
  - Total: 16.4 km^{2} (6.3 sq mi)

Population (2019-06-30)
  - Total: 2,478
  - Density: 151/km^{2} (391/sq mi)
- Time zone: UTC+1 (CET)
  - Summer (DST): UTC+2 (CEST)
- Postal code: 68-208
- Vehicle registration: FZA
- Climate: Cfb
- Website: http://www.leknica.pl

Łęknica (Polish pronunciation: [wɛŋkˈɲit͡sa]; German: Lugknitz; Upper Sorbian: Wjeska, pronounced [ˈwʲɛska]) is a border town in western Poland, one of the two gminas of Żary County in Lubusz Voivodeship.

Muskau Park (Park Mużakowski), a Polish-German World Heritage Site and Historic Monument of Poland, stretches north of the town centre.

== Geography ==
The town is situated in the Polish part of the historic Upper Lusatia region, in the broad valley of the Neisse river, which forms the border with Germany. A bridge across the river connects it with the opposite German town of Bad Muskau, another border crossing in the south leads to Krauschwitz. Łęknica's population numbers 2,478 (2019).

== History ==
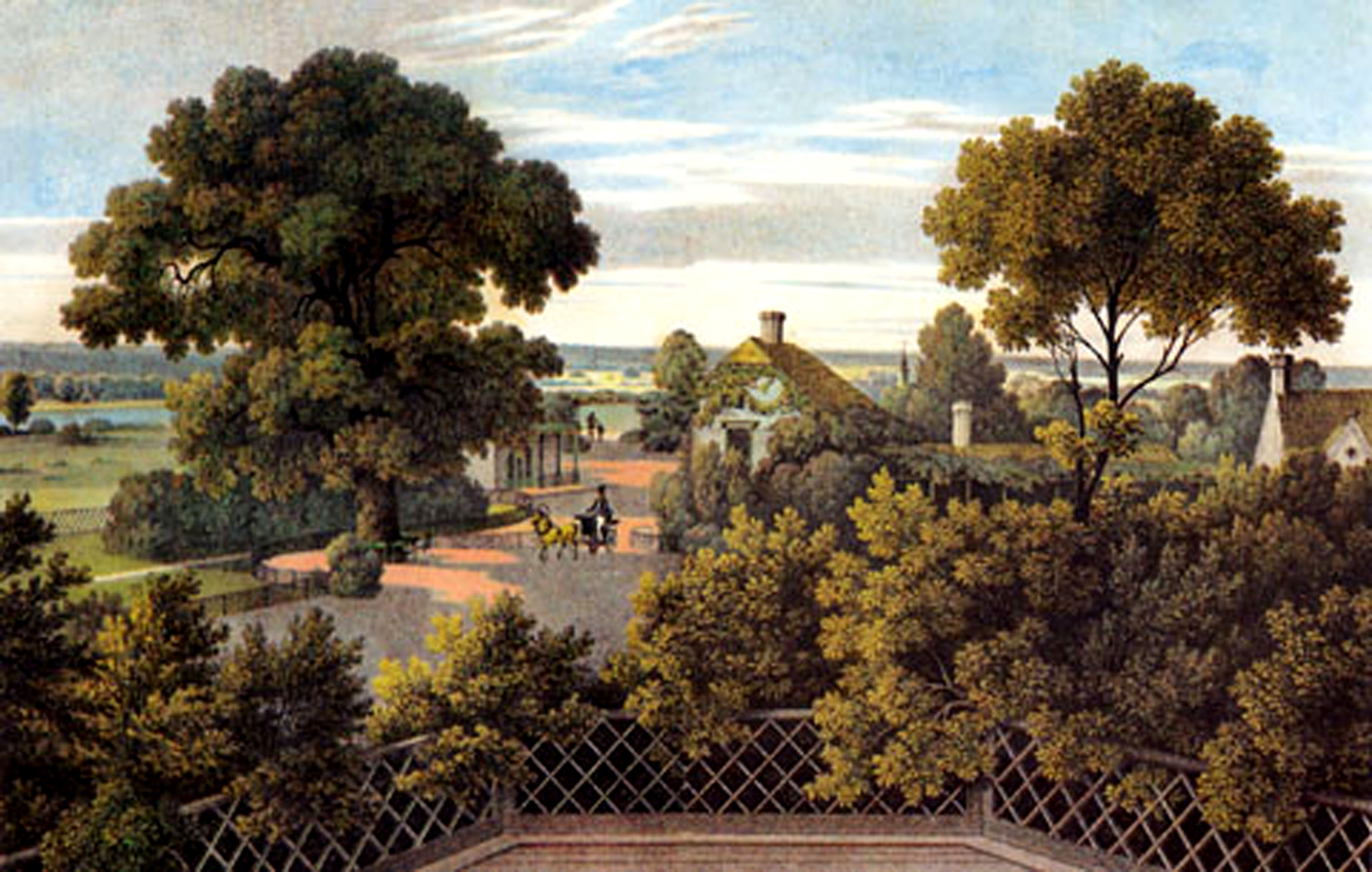
19th-century view of the English House (Dom Angielski) in the Łęknica part of the Muskau Park

The area along the Neisse river was already settled in the Bronze Age. While neighbouring Muskau was already mentioned in 1249 and was awarded town rights in 1452, the village of Lugnitz was first documented in 1505, then part of the Muskau state country.

According to the 1635 Peace of Prague, Lugknitz together with Upper Lusatia passed from the Bohemian Crown to the Electorate of Saxony and from 1697 to 1763 it was also under the rule of Polish kings in personal union. One of two main routes connecting Warsaw and Dresden ran through the area at that time. Upon the Congress of Vienna in 1815, it was ceded to Prussia and incorporated into the Province of Silesia. About 1880 it was still a small Sorbian agricultural village, one of only two Sorbian-speaking settlements east of the Neisse river, the other being Bronowice (Braunsdorf/Brunojcy). That changed with the turn of century, when industry was established on the Neisse. Brown coal started to be mined. Based on rich clay deposits, ceramic companies emerged and also glass factories.

From 1940 to 1945 the village was included within the town limits of Muskau as its eastern right-bank district. During World War II, 70% of the town was destroyed, as well as much of the industry (brown coal mine "Babina" from 40%, glassworks 30% and slate factories 50%). The town was separated from Bad Muskau by the new state border along the Oder–Neisse line, the remaining German population was expelled and the place was gradually settled with Polish military veterans, refugees, people returning from forced labour in Germany, people repatriated from France, Belgium and in 1958, 18 families repatriated from the Soviet Union settled in the town.

The settlement changed name several times, Łuknica in 1945–1947, then Ługnica and Łęknice. It received the name Łęknica in 1956 and obtained town privileges in 1969. In 1972 the border crossing between Poland and East Germany was opened and visa-free local border traffic was allowed.

== Twin towns – sister cities ==
Łęknica is twinned with:

- Bad Muskau, Germany
- Hejnice, Czech Republic

== Gallery ==
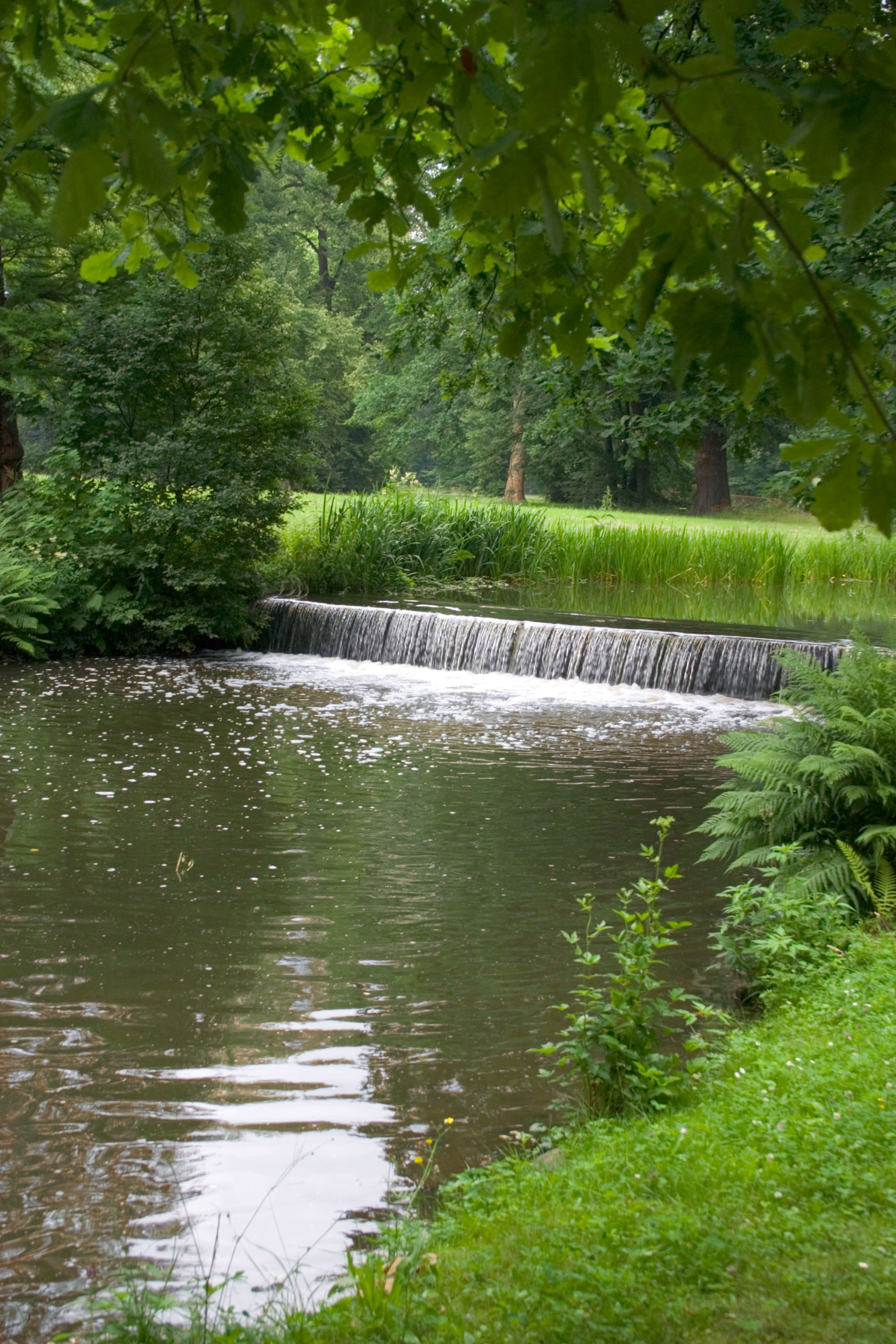
Mużakowski Park

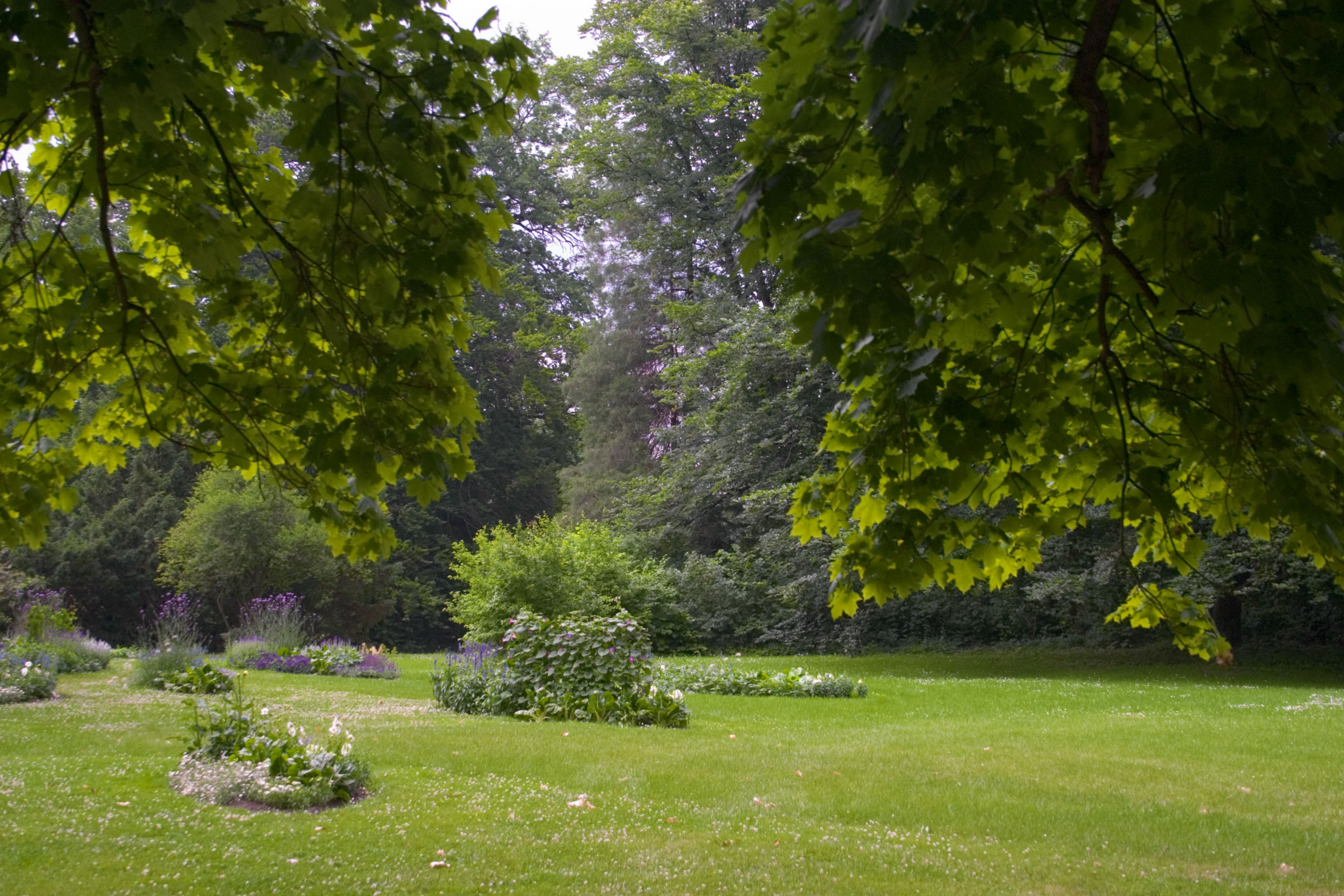
Mużakowski Park

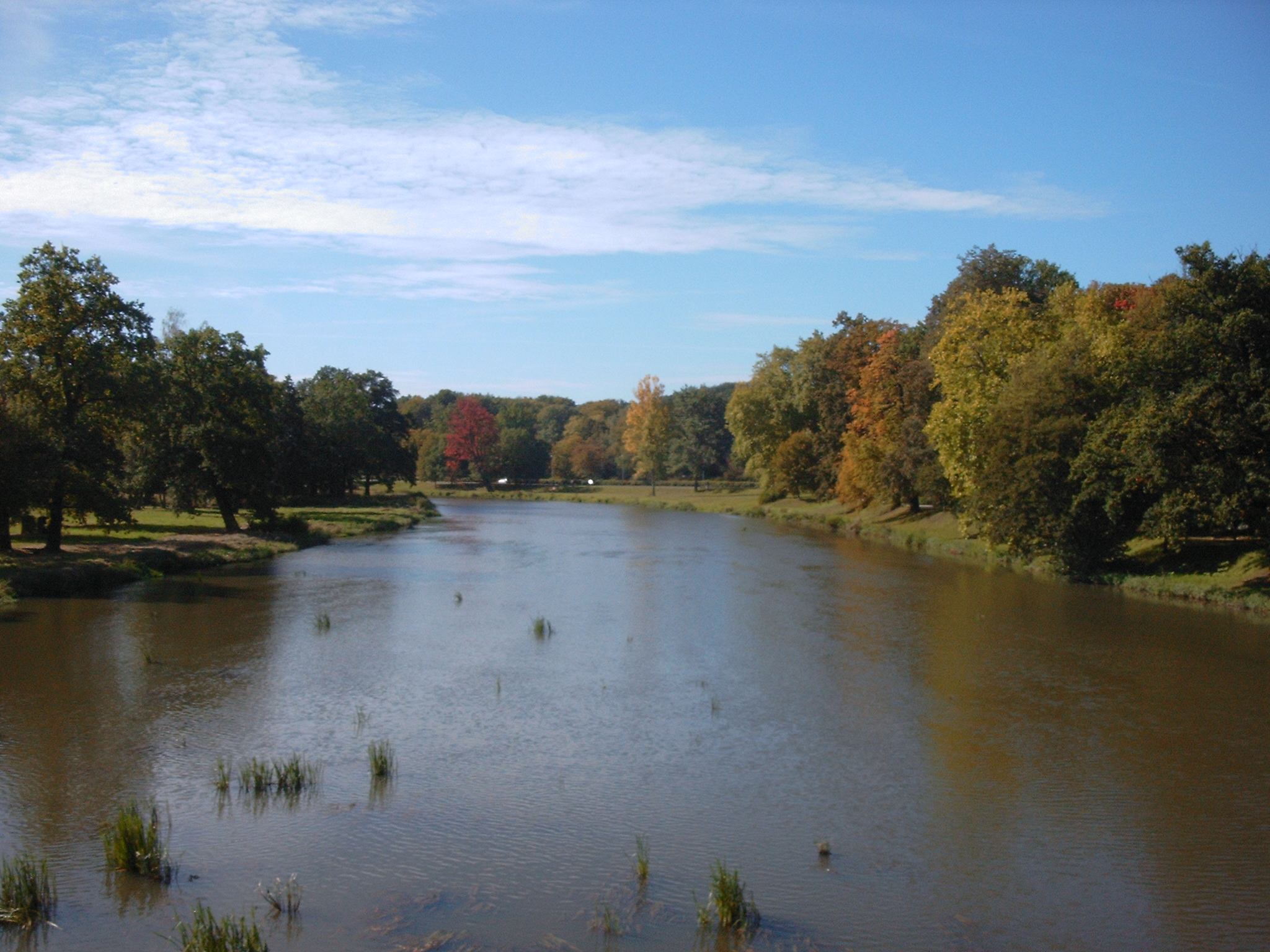
Mużakowski Park

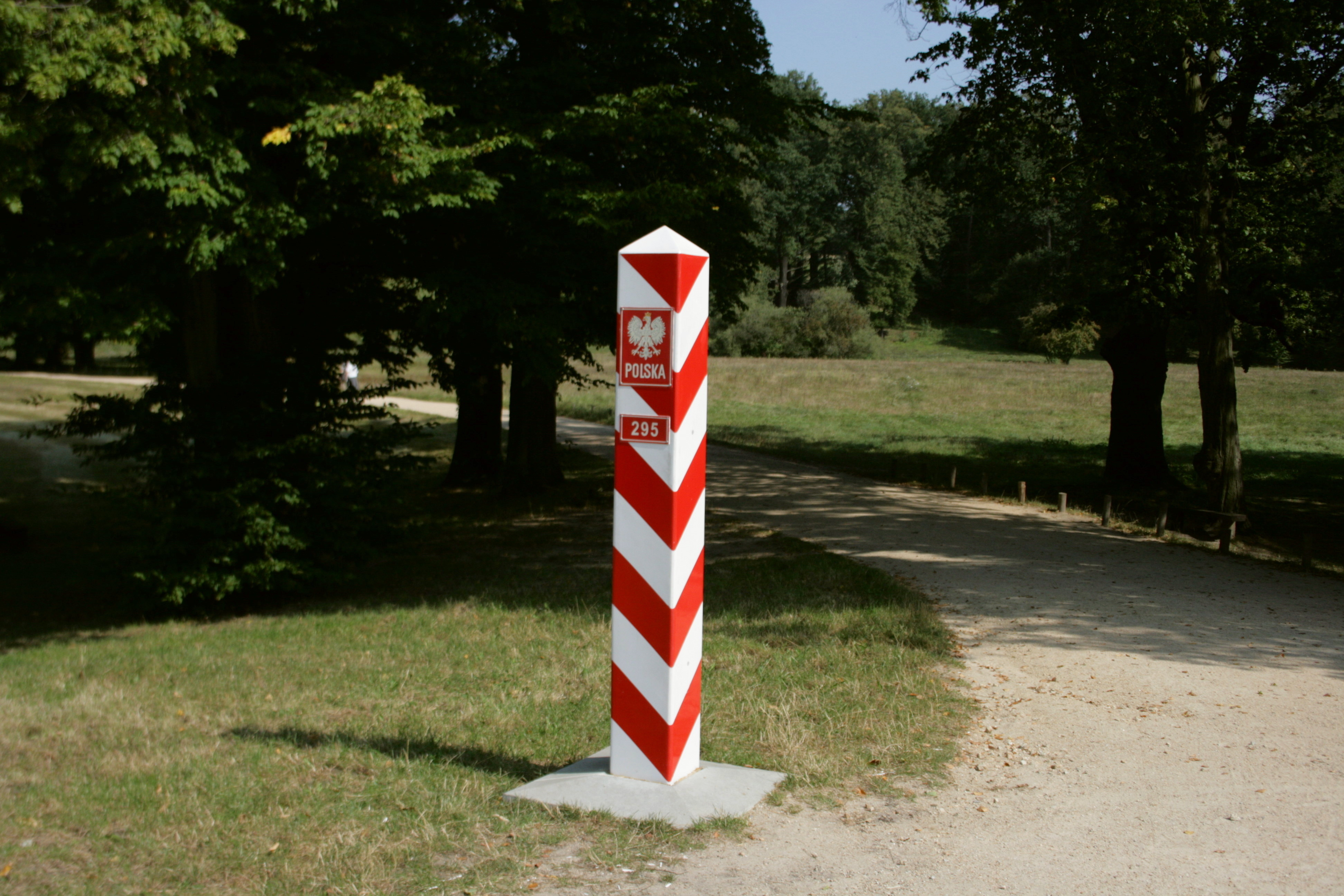
Polish boundary stone

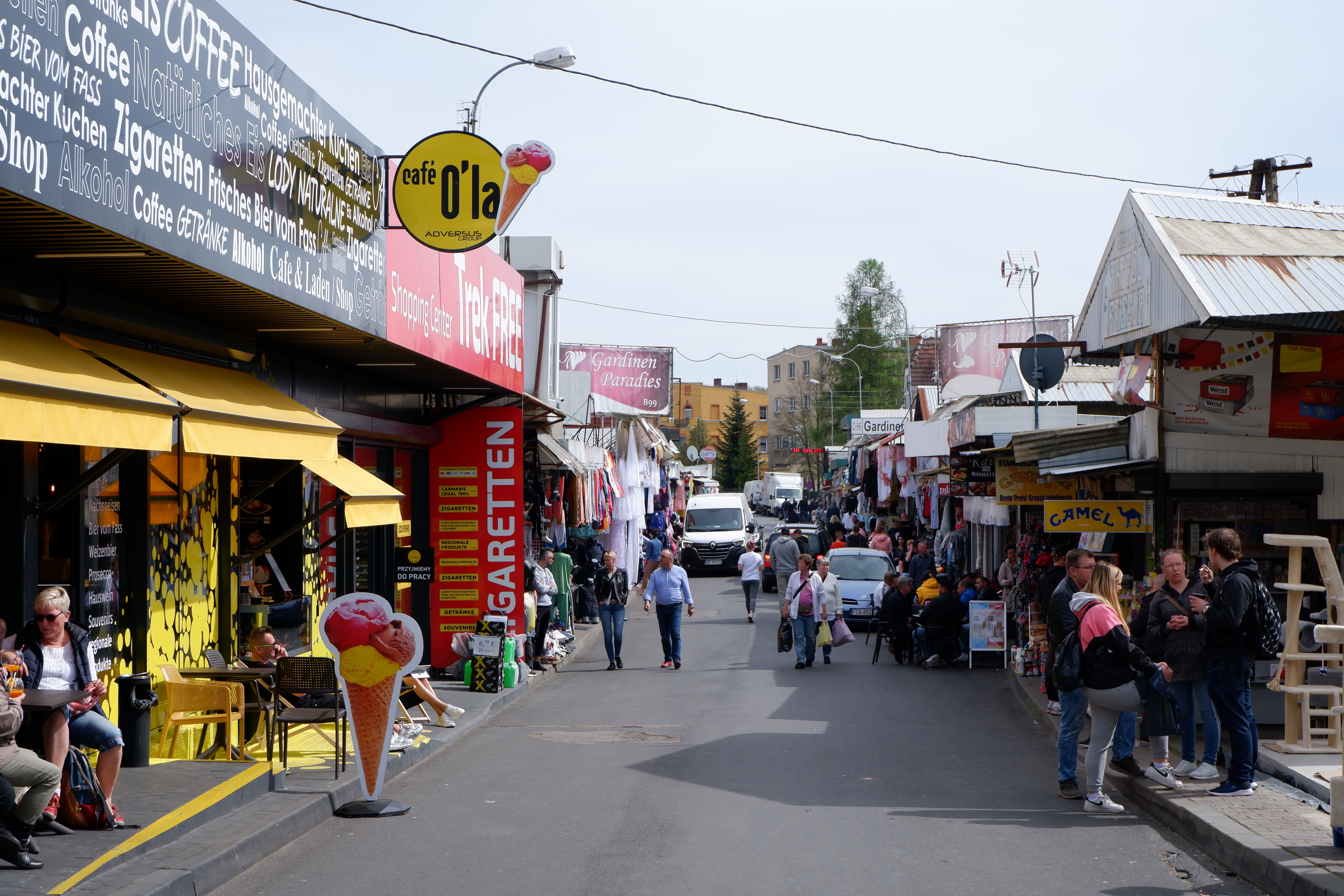
Polenmarkt
