= Żary County =

Żary County Powiat żarski
- County
- Flag Coat of arms

- Location within the voivodeship
- Coordinates (Żary): 51°38′N 15°8′E
- Country: Poland
- Voivodeship: Lubusz
- Seat: Żary
- Gminas: Total 10 (incl. 2 urban): Łęknica; Żary; Gmina Brody; Gmina Jasień; Gmina Lipinki Łużyckie; Gmina Lubsko; Gmina Przewóz; Gmina Trzebiel; Gmina Tuplice; Gmina Żary

Area
  - Total: 1,393.49 km^{2} (538.03 sq mi)

Population (2019-06-30)
  - Total: 96,496
  - Density: 69.248/km^{2} (179.35/sq mi)
  - Urban: 58,210
  - Rural: 38,286
- Car plates: FZA
- Website: http://www.powiatzary.pl

Żary County (Polish: powiat żarski) is a unit of territorial administration and local government (powiat) in Lubusz Voivodeship, western Poland, on the German border. It came into being on January 1, 1999, as a result of the Polish local government reforms passed in 1998. Its administrative seat and largest town is Żary, which lies 43 km (27 mi) south-west of Zielona Góra and 123 km (76 mi) south of Gorzów Wielkopolski. The county contains three other towns: Lubsko, lying 21 km (13 mi) north-west of Żary, Jasień, lying 16 km (10 mi) north-west of Żary, and Łęknica, 30 km (19 mi) west of Żary.

The county covers an area of 1,393.49 square kilometres (538.0 sq mi). As of 2019 its total population is 96,496, out of which the population of Żary is 37,502, that of Lubsko is 13,921, that of Jasień is 4,309, that of Łęknica is 2,478, and the rural population is 38,286.

== Neighbouring counties ==
Żary County is bordered by Krosno County to the north, Zielona Góra County to the north-east, Żagań County to the east and Zgorzelec County to the south. It also borders the German states of Saxony and Brandenburg to the west.

== Administrative divisions ==
The county is subdivided into 10 gminas (two urban, two urban-rural and six rural). These are listed in the following table, in descending order of population.

Gmina	Type	Area (km^{2})	Population (2019)	Seat
Żary	urban	33.2	37,502	
Gmina Lubsko	urban-rural	182.7	18,452	Lubsko
Gmina Żary	rural	294.4	12,343	Żary*
Gmina Jasień	urban-rural	127.0	7,040	Jasień
Gmina Trzebiel	rural	166.6	5,679	Trzebiel
Gmina Brody	rural	240.4	3,413	Brody
Gmina Lipinki Łużyckie	rural	88.6	3,366	Lipinki Łużyckie
Gmina Przewóz	rural	178.3	3,157	Przewóz
Gmina Tuplice	rural	65.9	3,066	Tuplice
Łęknica	urban	16.4	2,478	
* seat not part of the gmina
