= Kuzma Parfyonov =

Soviet Army major general

Kuzma Dmitriyevich Parfyonov
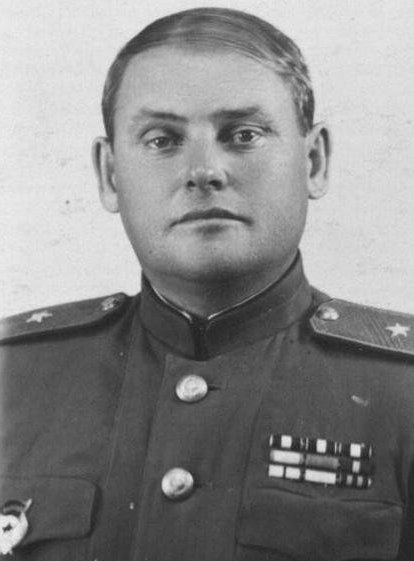
- Parfyonov between 1945 and 1950
- Born: 14 November 1907; Chistopol, Kazan Governorate, Russian Empire
- Died: 15 January 1987 (aged 79) Solnechnogorsk, Soviet Union
- Allegiance: Soviet Union
- Branch: Red Army (Soviet Army from 1946)
- Service years: 1927–1938; 1939–1959
- Rank: Major general
- Commands: 34th Guards Rifle Division; 4th Guards Rifle Division; 15th Guards Rifle Division
- Conflicts: World War II
- Awards: Order of Lenin

Kuzma Dmitriyevich Parfyonov (Russian: Кузьма Дмитриевич Парфёнов; 14 November 1907 – 15 January 1987) was a Soviet Army major general who held divisional commands during World War II.

Parfyonov rose through command and staff positions in the prewar Red Army, and was imprisoned for a year during the Great Purge. Being freed in 1939, he was a regimental chief of staff when Germany invaded the Soviet Union. Parfyonov spent much of the war with the 4th Guards Rifle Division, serving as chief of its operations section, a regimental commander, and deputy commander through near-constant combat on the Eastern Front. After serving as deputy commander of the 34th Guards Rifle Division from summer 1943, he returned to command the 4th Guards Rifle Division in spring 1944, leading it until the end of the war. Parfyonov continued to hold division commands postwar before ending his career in the 1950s in training roles.

== Early life and prewar service ==
A Russian, Kuzma Dmitriyevich Parfyonov was born on 14 November 1907 in the town of Chistopol, Kazan Governorate. He chose a military career and entered the Vladivostok Infantry School in September 1927. Parfyonov became a member of the Communist Party in 1929. After his graduation in April 1930, Parfyonov was posted to the 107th Rifle Regiment of the 36th Rifle Division of the Special Red Banner Far Eastern Army, serving as a platoon commander, rifle and training company commander, and assistant chief of the regimental school. He served as a tactics instructor at the Improvement Courses for Command Personnel of the Transbaikal Military District from December 1936 to May 1937, then returned to the 107th Rifle Regiment to serve as its assistant chief of staff.

From February 1938 he temporarily served as chief of staff of the regiment, but on 4 June was arrested by the NKVD during the Great Purge. He was falsely accused of being a Polish spy, member of a Trotskyist organization, and sabotage. Parfyonov was imprisoned under investigation until June 1939, when he was freed on the dismissal of the case against him. After being freed, Parfyonov, then a senior lieutenant, was placed at the disposal of the commander of Military Unit 5598. On the mobilization of the unit in August he was appointed assistant chief of staff of the 409th Rifle Regiment of the 137th Rifle Division of the Moscow Military District. Parfyonov completed advanced training at the Higher Military School of the Staff Service of the Red Army in Moscow between December 1939 and November 1940, then was appointed chief of staff of the 612th Rifle Regiment of the Moscow Military District's 144th Rifle Division.

== World War II ==
After Germany invaded the Soviet Union, the division was sent to the Western Front and assigned to the 20th Army, defending in the region of Lyudovichi and Kiseli in Smolensk Oblast. From mid-July the division attacked to capture Rudnya during the Battle of Smolensk. During the fighting, Parfyonov, then a captain, was evaluated as having displayed "fine organizational abilities, courage and heroism. He skillfully directed the subunits of the regiment through the staff." He was wounded in action that month.

In August, Parfyonov was appointed chief of the Operations Staff Section of the 161st Rifle Division. In this role, he took part in the Yelnya offensive. For its victory in the offensive the division became the elite 4th Guards Rifle Division. After the offensive, the division was withdrawn to the reserve of the 20th Army, then to the Reserve of the Supreme High Command and relocated to Kalinin. The division fought as part of the 54th Army of the Leningrad Front in the region of Sinyavino, Chyornaya Rechka, and Gontovaya Lipka, taking part in the Sinyavino offensive, between 20 September and 24 October. After end of the Sinyavino fighting the 4th Guards Rifle Division was shifted to the Tikhvin sector and assigned to the 4th Separate Army, taking part in the Tikhvin defensive and Tikhvin Offensive Operations.

Parfyonov was appointed commander of the division's 11th Guards Rifle Regiment on 27 February 1942, replacing Ivan Buslayev, who had fallen ill. He led the regiment in the Lyuban Offensive Operation, during which the 4th Guards fought as part of the 2nd Shock (from 4 February), 54th (from 27 February), and 59th (from 4 April) Armies. The division was withdrawn to the Reserve of the Supreme High Command in July and in mid-August relocated to the Stalingrad Front. As part of the 1st Guards, 21st and 4th Tank Armies the division took part in the Battle of Stalingrad, defending the approaches to the city in the Don bend. The 4th Tank Army was redesignated the 65th Army on 23 October and with the army the division took part in Operation Uranus. From 10 December the division, as part of the 5th Shock Army pursued retreating German troops to the Mius river in the Kotelnikovo, North Caucasus and Rostov offensive operations. In March 1943 Parfyonov was appointed deputy commander for the rear of the division. Until mid-August it fought in sustained defensive battles on the Mius-Front.

Parfyonov, then a colonel, was transferred to serve as deputy commander for the combat units of the 5th Shock Army's 34th Guards Rifle Division in August 1943. In this role, he took part in the Donbass and Melitopol offensives. For his performance in the capture of Ordzhonikidze (Yenakiyevo) during the Donbass Offensive, in which he commanded the mobile detachments of the division's parent 31st Guards Rifle Corps, Parfyonov was recommended for the Order of the Red Banner by division commander Filipp Braylyan, receiving the award on 25 December. The recommendation read:

On 3 September 1943 during the offensive of units of the corps on the city of Ordzhonikidze, Stalino Oblast, Comrade Parfyonov was ordered to command the forward mobile detachments of the corps, which had the task of suddenly bursting into the city, creating panic and cutting the path of the enemy's retreat, furthering with this the movement of the main forces of the corps, and developing the success to take the city.

Comrade Parfyonov fully accomplished the assigned objectives, being personally with the combat units of the detachments, skillfully organized combined arms cooperation and directed the fighting of the detachments. Comrade Parfyonov, with the detachment of the 34th Guards Rifle Division, was first to burst into the city, reached the western outskirts of the city to cut the path of the enemy's retreat and captured an artillery battalion consisting of 14 guns.

The operations of the detachments furthered the successful advance and the units of the corps took the city of Ordzhonikidze without loss...

For skillful leadership of the detachments and displaying in this personal courage he is deserving of the award of the Order of the Red Banner.

Between 5 December 1943 and 5 January 1944 Parfyonov temporarily commanded the division, while it was assigned to the 69th Army in the Reserve of the Supreme High Command for rebuilding. When Braylyan returned from the hospital, Parfyonov reverted to division deputy commander. In mid-January the division was relocated to the region of Sinelnikovo, Dnepropetrovsk, and Shchorsk, where it was assigned to the 46th Army of the 3rd Ukrainian Front. The 34th Guards fought in the Nikopol–Krivoi Rog offensive, during which it liberated Nikopol and Apostolovo. Parfyonov returned to the 4th Guards Rifle Division, part of the army's 31st Guards Rifle Corps, as its new commander on 21 March, succeeding Gavriil Kukharev, who had been killed the previous day. He led the division in the Bereznegovatoye–Snigirevka offensive and the Odessa Offensive. The division was withdrawn to the front reserve for rebuilding between early June and August, then returned to the 46th Army to take part in the Second Jassy–Kishinev offensive and the Debrecen Offensive Operation. For his performance in the Jassy–Kishinev offensive, corps commander Sergey Bobruk recommended Parfyonov for the Order of Suvorov, 2nd class, which he was awarded on 13 September. The recommendation read:

Comrade Parfyonov finely organized the preparation of the operation to break through the German-Romanian defense on the Dniester, successfully carrying out the breakthrough and pursuit of the beaten enemy. The units of the 4th Guards Rifle Division were the first to force a crossing of the Prut, and captured significant trophies, both on the left and right banks of the river. Discipline in the division was maintained at the required level. The operations of the units were correctly directed, cooperation organized well...Guards Colonel Parfyonov, for his correct and courageous leadership, is deserving of the state award of the Order of Suvorov, 2nd class.

The division was transferred to the 4th Guards Army on 11 November, taking part in the Budapest offensive. Parfyonov's division forced a crossing of the Danube on 2 December and by 29 December was one of the first units to link up with troops of the 2nd Ukrainian Front in the Esztergom region, strengthening the outer Budapest encirclement ring. In January 1945 the division took part the defense against German attempts to relieve Budapest. Under the pressure of superior German forces the 4th Guards Rifle Division was forced to retreat, stopping the German advance near Bicske. For his performance in the Budapest Offensive, Parfyonov was recommended for another Order of the Red Banner by Bobruk, which he was awarded on 4 March. The recommendation read:

During the period of the conduct of the operation of the corps beyond the Danube, the 4th Guards Rifle Division, being the lead division of the corps, skillfully carried out battles to reduce the enemy defenses on the right bank of the Danube and on the enemy's heels quickly came up to the second enemy defensive line on the line of Lakes Velence and Balaton, inflicting great losses in personnel and equipment on the enemy...

During the breakthrough of the second defensive line at Lake Velence Colonel Parfyonov employed a bold maneuver, sending one regiment through the marshes of Lake Velence, inflicting a strike into the enemy flank and rear, breaking the resistance of the enemy and in several hours excellently accomplished the assigned objectives for the day. Subsequently, he finely organized the cooperation of infantry with tanks and artillery, breaking the enemy resistance, capturing the city of Esztergrom together with tanks, severing the enemy's last line of retreat to the west.

During the retreat battles of the corps from the line of Neszmély and Tata, the division, defending on a broad front, held back the strong strike of enemy tank units and skillfully maneuvering, covered the main axis to Budapest.

For skillful organization of battle and control in battle, and also for displaying courage and valor, Colonel Parfyonov is deserving of the state award of the Order of the Red Banner.

The division assisted in the breakthrough of fortified defenses between Lakes Velence and Balaton on 13 March, after which it pursued the retreating German troops. The division captured Kapuvar on 29 March during the Vienna Offensive, and began the storming of Vienna itself on 8 April, taking the city on 13 April. Parfyonov was promoted to major general on 19 April 1945, and for his performance in the Vienna Offensive received the Order of Kutuzov, 2nd class.

== Postwar ==
Postwar, Parfyonov continued to command the division. In March 1947 he was sent to the Higher Academic Courses at the Voroshilov Higher Military Academy for further training, then in December transferred to the Special Department of the academy. He graduated from the academy in December 1949 and was sent to the Carpathian Military District to command the 15th Guards Rifle Division in March 1950. Parfyonov completed а training course at the Military History Department of the Voroshilov Academy between October 1951 and June 1953, then was appointed chief of the course for regimental commanders at the Vystrel courses. He served as assistant chief of the courses for tactical preparation and chief of the tactics lecture. Parfyonov was retired due to illness on 17 December 1959, and died in Solnechnogorsk on 15 January 1987.

== Awards ==
Parfyonov was a recipient of the following awards:

- Order of Lenin
- Order of the Red Banner (4)
- Order of Suvorov, 2nd class
- Order of Kutuzov, 2nd class
- Order of the Patriotic War, 1st class (6 April 1985 for the 40th anniversary of the victory in World War II)
- Order of the Partisan Star, 1st class (Yugoslavia)
- Order of 9 September 1944, 2nd class (Bulgaria)
