= 335th Division =

335th Division may refer to:

- 335th Infantry Division, Wehrmacht, Germany
- 335th Rifle Division, Soviet Union

== See also ==
- List of military divisions by number
