= Use of cluster munitions in the Russian invasion of Ukraine =

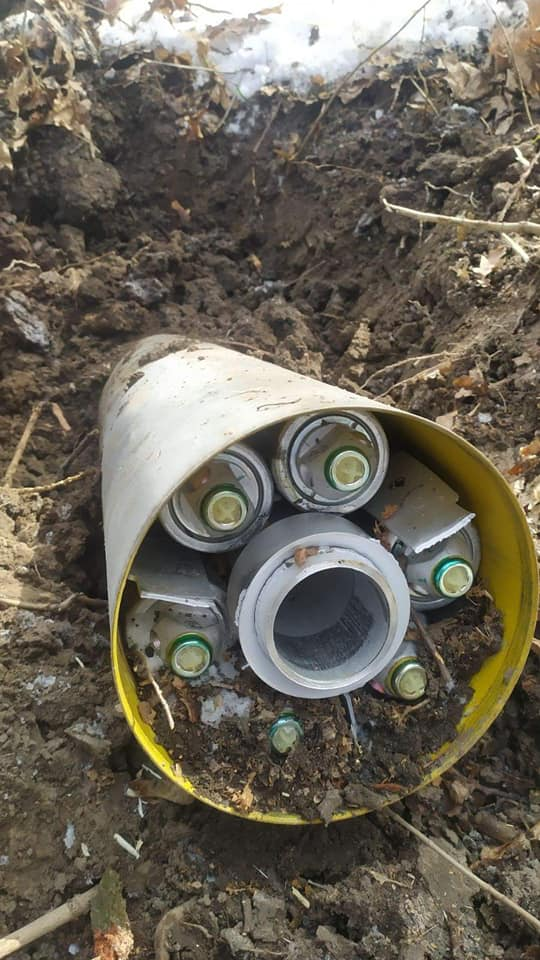
Unexploded cluster shell in Kharkiv region, 2022

The use of cluster munitions during the Russian invasion of Ukraine has been recorded by a number of eyewitnesses and journalists, as well as representatives of the UN, humanitarian and public organizations. In particular, the head of the UN Human Rights Council, Michelle Bachelet, reported on March 30 at least 24 cases since the beginning of the invasion. As of July 1, hundreds of attacks by Russian forces with cluster munitions have already been recorded in the settlements of the Dnipropetrovsk, Donetsk, Zaporizhzhia, Kyiv, Luhansk, Mykolaiv, Odesa, Sumy, Kharkiv, Kherson and Chernihiv regions. 215 civilians are known to have been killed in these shellings and 474 injured, many of which may go unreported. Both Russia as well as Ukraine have used cluster munitions during the conflict, however, Russian use has been extensive while Ukrainian use has been more limited.

Neither Russia nor Ukraine are signatories of the 2008 convention limiting the use of cluster munitions. The use of such weapons against civilians violates the principles of humanitarian law and therefore constitutes a war crime. Reports of Russian attacks have prompted the International Criminal Court to launch an investigation into the commission of war crimes in Ukrainian territory.

== Background ==
Cluster munitions are explosive devices filled with smaller projectiles or submunitions. Such rockets or artillery shells usually explode while still in the air or on impact with a target, scattering submunitions in a radius of up to 400 meters. Shrapnel hits nearby buildings and people in range. The use of cluster munitions in civilian areas makes the attack indiscriminate, which violates the foundations of international humanitarian law. The use of such munitions has been criticized by human rights groups and a number of governments.

Cluster munitions dropped too low can become lodged in trees or on soft ground. Of the 7 thousand charges fired by one rocket launcher, about 2% do not detonate. Such unexploded ordnance in the future pose a threat to civilians in the conflict zone, their detection and detonation are costly. A significant part of the submunitions also does not detonate on impact: according to various estimates, 20-40%. Therefore, the use of cluster munitions, even outside of populated areas, is of serious concern to the international community, as it is associated with a long-term indiscriminate danger. Projectiles can explode if picked up or moved by children, farmers, or other civilians. These risks sometimes persist for years until specialists find and properly dispose of such explosives.

The Convention on Cluster Munitions, which entered into force in 2010, bans their use due to the potential danger to civilians. More than 120 countries have signed the pact, and, according to the Cluster Monitor Coalition, in more than twelve years of its existence, 36 states have destroyed almost 1.5 million cluster munitions containing about 178 million submunitions. However, 110 countries, including Russia and Ukraine, have not ratified the UN-backed treaty. Russia continues to produce cluster munitions and used at least two new types of them during the invasion (along with old stocks). As of August 2022, cluster munitions are not used anywhere except on the territory of Ukraine.

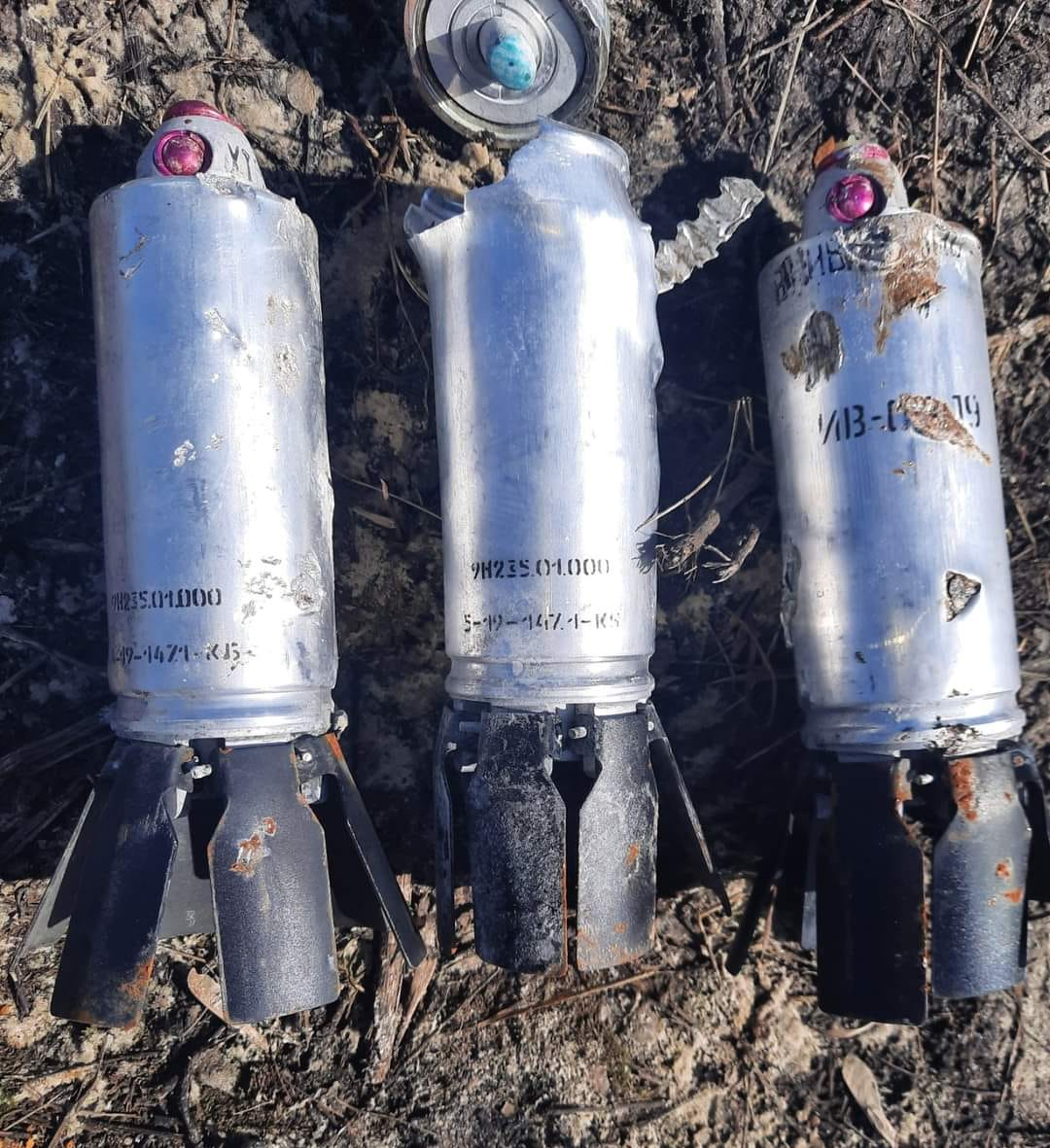
Unexploded cluster munition submunitions in Kharkiv region, 2022

Regardless of the participation of governments in the initiative to limit cluster weapons, their use violates the principles of humanitarian law. Such attacks are indiscriminate and usually involve disproportionate civilian casualties relative to the military advantage gained. Both the Russian authorities and the Ukrainian authorities are subject to international legal norms that limit the methods of warfare, in particular the ban on indiscriminate attacks. If the army commander does not distinguish between civilians and soldiers, as well as between civilian and military objects, it's considered a war crime.

Nevertheless, both sides of the conflict continue to use cluster munitions. For 2022, both Russia and Ukraine had stockpiles of Smerch and Uragan artillery rockets equipped with cluster warheads. According to the International Committee of the Red Cross, most cluster munitions in stock are over 20 years old, making them more unreliable and increasing the risk of civilian casualties.

In 2014 and 2015, Russian-backed militias used cluster munitions during battles in eastern Ukraine, according to Human Rights Watch investigations. As weapons, surface 300-mm Smerch rockets and 220-mm Uragan cluster munitions were used, which deliver 9N210 and 9N235 anti-personnel fragmentation submunitions. As a result of attacks in seven villages controlled by the Ukrainian side, at least 13 civilians were killed, including two children. Attacks have also been recorded in territory held by the LPR and DPR, although both Ukrainian and Russian authorities condemned and denied the use of cluster munitions in populated areas. Ukrainian authorities later investigated the use of cluster weapons by their own troops, but international activists called it insufficient and inadequate.

== Use by Russia ==
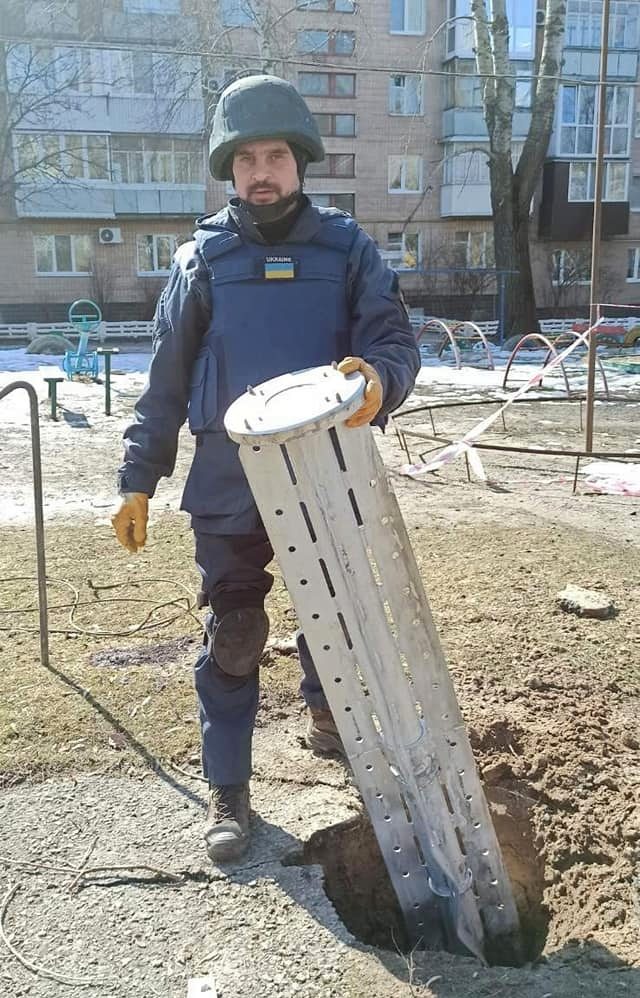
An employee of the State Emergency Service of Ukraine near a fragment of a Russian rocket in Kharkiv, March 23, 2022

Although the Russian side denies accusations of using cluster munitions in residential areas, international and non-governmental organizations have reported such attacks. By the beginning of April, Ukrainian law enforcement agencies were reporting cluster munition shelling in Kharkiv, Sumy, Kyiv, Donetsk, Odesa, Kherson and Mykolaiv regions. By July 1, Cluster Munition Coalition reports shelling in Dnipropetrovsk, Donetsk, Zaporizhzhia, Luhansk, Mykolaiv, Odesa, Sumy, Kharkiv, Kherson and Chernihiv regions. Testimony from independent weapons experts confirmed that a number of cluster rounds were dropped on residential buildings and civilian infrastructure. This is proved by photos and videos of eyewitnesses of the events, as well as journalists on the ground. Much of this data was collected by Ukrainian prosecutors and passed on to the International Criminal Court. In early March, an investigation began into the commission of war crimes and crimes against humanity in Ukraine. An August 2022 Cluster Munition Coalition report noted that Russia has used cluster munitions extensively during conflict, inflicting hundreds of civilian casualties and damaging civilian infrastructure.

The UN Human Rights Monitoring Mission confirmed that during the first month of the war in 2022, the Russian military used cluster weapons in Ukrainian settlements at least 16 times. At the end of March, the head of the UN Human Rights Council, Michelle Bachelet, reported at least 24 cases since the invasion began. The agency indicated that the attacks damaged medical facilities, including 50 hospitals. As of August 2022, there have already been hundreds of cases of Russian use of cluster munitions in at least 10 out of 24 regions of Ukraine. It is known that 215 civilians were killed and 474 wounded during these attacks, and many cases may remain unknown. At least 7 people were killed and 3 were injured by submunitions that did not explode immediately. The shelling of cluster munitions mainly affected civilian infrastructure: residential buildings, hospitals, schools, playgrounds, in one case a cemetery.

During the invasion of Ukraine, the Russian army used at least 6 types of cluster munitions: missiles for multiple rocket launchers "Hurricane", "Smerch", "Tornado-S", missile systems "Tochka" and "Iskander-M", as well as RBC bombs -500 with PTAB-1M submunitions. Smerch missiles were used for 72 submunitions, as well as other charges for 50 submunitions. According to the Russian manufacturer, missiles used in residential areas can contain up to 1.45 kg of explosive and scatter into about 316 fragments. The most large-scale Russian attacks with weapons include:

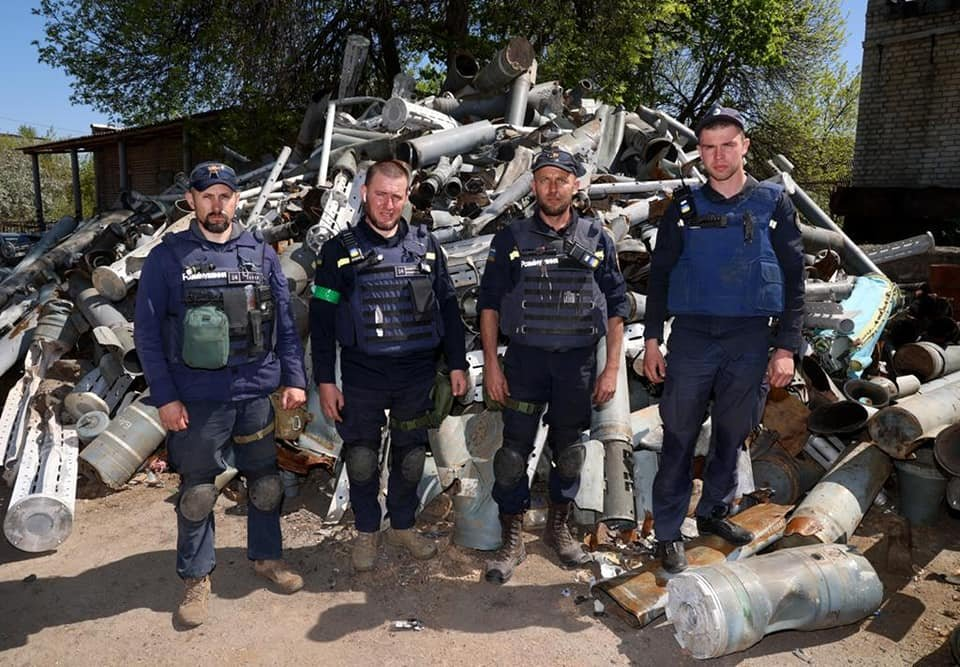
- Remains of clusters and other munitions collected by the State Emergency Service of Ukraine in the Kharkiv region, May 10, 2022
  Shelling of the Central City Hospital in Vuhledar on February 24, 2022 (Donetsk region). According to the UN Monitoring Mission in Ukraine, the Russian attack killed at least 4 civilians and injured 10, damaged ambulances and destroyed a hospital building. A Human Rights Watch investigation documented the use of cluster munitions as Iskander short-range ballistic missiles, as well as a ballistic missile of the Tochka system with a 9N123 cluster warhead for 50 submunitions. Human rights activists called the use of shells with a wide radius of destruction in densely populated areas "blatant disregard for the lives of civilians".
- The shelling of the preschool "Sonechko" in the city of Okhtyrka on February 25, 2022 (Sumy region). According to the UN Monitoring Mission and Amnesty International, a public human rights organization, an attack by six 220-mm Uragan rockets with cluster warheads on a building where civilians were hiding killed at least 2 adults and 1 child, 1 other child was injured.
- Shelling of residential areas in Kharkiv on February 25 and 28, 2022. The UN monitoring mission reported that at least 9 civilians were killed and 37 were injured during the first cluster munition rocket attack. Four days after the start of the Russian invasion, Amnesty International documented three more attacks with cluster munitions in the northern part of Kharkiv. At the same time, UN officials reported 9 dead and 37 injured civilians as a result of the attacks. In just 11 days of artillery shelling of Kharkiv by Russian troops, 450 civilians were killed or wounded, apartment buildings, schools and shops were destroyed. A later investigation by Human Rights Watch confirmed that the Russian side fired 9M55K Smerch cluster munitions into three districts of Kharkiv. The direction of some of the unguided rocket elements stuck into the ground indicated that they were launched from the Russian border. At least 11 missiles were tracked by CNN to the 79th Russian rocket artillery brigade based in the Belgorod region of Russia. She reported directly to the head of the Western Military District of the Russian armed forces, Colonel General Alexander Zhuravlev. Previously, he led the battles for Aleppo in Syria, where there were also reports of massive use of cluster munitions, although the Russian Ministry of Defense denied this. In April 17, in Kharkiv, at least 3 sappers were killed and 4 sappers were seriously injured from explosions of cluster munitions, who were decontaminating ammunition found in the city. On May 8, south of the city, in the Sinelnikovsky district of the Dnipropetrovsk region, a 12-year-old boy who stumbled upon it died from the explosion of a cluster submunition. In total, at least 9 people suffered from such ammunition in the Dnipropetrovsk region.
- Shelling of Mykolaiv on March 7, 11 and 13, 2022. Specialists from the Médecins Sans Frontières association found numerous small holes typical of cluster munition attacks on the territory of the oncological hospital of the city. A later Human Rights Watch investigation confirmed the use of cluster weapons in the shelling of residential buildings. Only during the attack on March 13, 9 civilians were killed in line at an ATM, numerous injuries were recorded among local residents, houses and civilian cars were destroyed. Remnants of Uragan and Smerch cluster munitions, unexploded 9N210 fragmentation submunitions were identified on the photo and video from the scene. May 7, the mayor of Mykolaiv, Oleksandr Senkevych, told reporters that during the shelling of the city, the Russian army fired at least 40 cluster munitions, mainly at residential buildings. As the authorities prepared for such an attack, most of the population was evacuated, but at least 60 were reported to have been seriously injured.
- Shelling of Mariupol in March–May 2022. Independent media and the Ukrainian side accused the Russian military of bombing civilian shelters with cluster munitions during shelling of the city and attacks on Azovstal. According to the mayor of Mariupol, at the end of April, during the two-month siege of the city by Russian troops, more than 20 thousand people died - twice as many than the 2 year occupation of the city during World War II. Oksana Pokalchuk, director of Amnesty International Ukraine, said they were able to prove the use of cluster munitions by Russia after interviewing a victim who provided them with a fragment of ammunition that was removed from his thigh.
- Shelling in Bucha and other cities of the Kyiv region. According to Oleg Tkalenko, deputy chief prosecutor of the Kyiv region, forensic experts found fragments of cluster munitions in bodies from mass graves in Bucha after the retreat of Russian troops. The exact number of civilians killed specifically due to the use of cluster munitions in the village was unknown, but at least 8 out of about 500. The Bellingcat war crimes team confirmed the use of RBK-500 cluster munitions with PTAB-submunitions in Bucha 1M and cluster missiles fired by the BM-30 Smerch. The mayor of the city, Anatoly Fedoruk, stated that "Bucha was turned into a Chechen safari, where land mines were used against civilians". Many civilians were killed by cluster munitions in Borodyanka. The damage from cluster munitions in the vicinity of Gostomel was so great that many animals died from them.
- The Kramatorsk railway station missile attack on April 8, 2022 (Donetsk region). More than 50 people were killed and injured in a Russian missile attack on a railway station. Eyewitnesses reported multiple explosions characteristic of cluster munitions. BBC journalists confirmed characteristic cluster fragmentation around the main impact and the presence of the remains of a Soviet Tochka-U missile, which can be equipped with a cluster warhead with 50 submunitions.
- Shelling of Odessa in April 2024. At least 5 people were killed. At least 32 people were injured as a result of the attack, including 2 children and a pregnant woman.

In addition, it was reported about the use of cluster munitions in the residential sector of the city of Pokrovsk (Donetsk region, March 4), Krasnogorovka (Donetsk region, March 27), Slavyansk (Donetsk region, April 22), and in the villages of Kiinka and Pavlovka (Chernihiv region, February 28).

International law prohibits deliberate attacks on civilians or civilian infrastructure. The Russians denied the accusations, assuring that it strikes "only at military facilities and exclusively with high-precision weapons." Presidential spokesman Dmitry Peskov said that the accusations against Russia are “a duck, this is a duck for sure”. However, analysts at the international non-governmental organization Bellingcat considered it “highly unlikely” that the Ukrainian side would use explosive weapons in their own cities.

== Use by Ukraine ==
In early March 2022, The New York Times reported the first use of a cluster munition by Ukrainian troops during the invasion near the farm Husarivka. It landed close to the Russian army's headquarters. According to the report, nobody died in that strike. An August 2022 Cluster Munition Coalition report noted that Ukraine has used cluster munitions in a limited capacity.

Human Rights Watch issued a report claiming that, despite Ukraine's denials, Ukrainian forces had fired cluster munitions into and around Russian-controlled Izium in 2022, killing and wounding many of its own citizens. The group called for both sides to halt the use of such munitions and for the US to stop supplying them to Ukraine, describing their uses by both Ukraine and Russia as violations of international humanitarian law and possible war crimes.

On 7 December 2022, CNN reported that Ukraine was seeking access to American stockpiles of cluster munitions, due to a shortage of ammunition for HIMARS type and 155 mm artillery systems. Ukraine claimed American cluster munitions would give them an edge over Russian artillery while also preventing the depletion of other US and Western artillery stocks.

In March 2023, Reuters reported that Ukraine sought to procure CBU-100 cluster bombs from the U.S. stockpile in order to dismantle them, extracting the submunitions and use them as individual bomblets to be dropped from drones against enemy armour in a targeted manner. It also petitioned the U.S. for deliver of 155 mm artillery cluster shells to be used in the east of the country against infantry assaults that had notably been employed by Russian forces during the Battle of Bakhmut. In June 2023, Reuters reported that the U.S. military had assessed that cluster munitions would be useful in Ukraine's effort to push back Russian occupation forces. In July 2023, the BBC reported that Ukraine could use cluster munitions to suppress enemy fire from trenches and could also be used to clear through Russian minefields. U.S. president Joe Biden approved the provision of cluster munitions to Ukraine on 6 July, bypassing U.S. law prohibiting the transfer of cluster munitions with a failure rate greater than one percent. According to President Biden the decision was made as a result of the US running low on conventional 155mm ammunition to supply the Ukrainians whose ammunition stockpiles are also running low.

Russia accused Ukraine of using cluster munitions in strikes on Belgorod that killed at least 21 people and wounded dozens more on 30 December 2023.

In late 2023, Ukrainian troops reported that their cluster munitions were becoming increasingly ineffective against Russian forces. A Ukrainian platoon commander on the Bakhmut front told The New York Times that the Russians were adapting to Ukraine's usage of cluster munitions by assaulting in smaller infantry units and by digging their trenches deeper. Despite this, some U.S. military professionals contend that over 50% of all Russian casualties in the war have been caused by cluster munitions. From July 2023 until October 2024, it is estimated that at least 350,000 Russian casualties were caused by cluster munitions. According to John Nagl (Oct 2024), "cluster munitions from 155mm howitzers, HIMARS launchers and now F-16s" are winning the war for Ukraine.

== Unattributed attacks ==
On 14 March 2022, a Tochka-U missile hit an area in the center of Donetsk, controlled by the DNR. Scattered debris and striking elements hit the civilian population. The Investigative Committee of Russia declared 23 dead and 37 wounded. Ukraine and Russia put the blame on each other.

== Consequences and reactions ==
Numerous evidence collected by international organizations and journalists in occupied or besieged Ukrainian cities confirms the use of cluster munitions by Russia against civilians. On March 3, 2022, the International Criminal Court launched an investigation into the fact that the Russian army committed war crimes and genocide on Ukrainian territory. It could officially confirm the use of cluster munitions in residential areas. At the same time, many experts argued that the invasion itself is already a crime, since it falls under the definition of an aggressive war.

In connection with reports of violations of human rights and international humanitarian law in Ukraine, the UN Council announced on March 4, 2022 the creation of a Commission of Inquiry into the events in the country. The members of the body, established initially for one year, were required to "establish the facts, circumstances and root causes of any violations and abuses" against human rights during the escalation of the Russian-Ukrainian conflict. The independent international committee included investigators from Norway, Bosnia and Herzegovina, Colombia, who were assisted by the agency's observers at the scene. On March 11, the UN Human Rights Office confirmed that it had received "credible reports" of several instances of cluster munitions being used by Russian forces. By the end of the month, representatives of the organization had already reported 24 established attacks.

In early March, the use of cluster munitions by Russian troops in Ukraine was condemned by representatives of the European Union, the Secretary General of NATO, as well as the authorities of the United Kingdom as a country-president of the Convention on Cluster Munitions. They called the actions of the Russian military "a flagrant violation of international law". In mid-March, the representative of the US President to the UN accused Russia of using banned weapons in Ukraine, including cluster munitions and vacuum bombs. Concern about the use of cluster munitions against the civilian population was expressed by the official representative of the UN Human Rights Office, the Deputy Secretary of State of the United States, as well as a number of humanitarian international organizations.

In May 2022, Russia's use of cluster munitions in Ukraine was strongly condemned at the intersessional meetings of the Convention on Cluster Munitions.

== See also ==
- Battle of Kyiv (2022)
- Siege of Mariupol
- Battle of Antonov Airport
- Battle of Irpin
