= 349th Division =

349th Division may refer to:

- 349th Infantry Division, Wehrmacht, Germany
- 349th Rifle Division, Soviet Union

== See also ==
- List of military divisions by number
