= 34th Guards Rifle Division =

- Active: 29 August 1942 – May 1946
- Country: Soviet Union
- Allegiance: Red Army / Soviet Army
- Branch: Infantry
- Engagements: World War II; Battle of Stalingrad; Donbas Strategic Offensive; Battle of the Dnieper; Nikopol–Krivoi Rog Offensive; Second Jassy–Kishinev Offensive; Siege of Budapest; Operation Spring Awakening
- Decorations: Order of the Red Banner; Order of Kutuzov, 2nd class
- Battle honours: Yenakiyevo

The 34th Guards Rifle Division was a rifle division of the Red Army during World War II.

== History ==
The 34th Guards Rifle Division was originally formed on 29 August 1942 from the 7th Airborne Corps in the Moscow Military District. It was assigned to the 28th Army, part of the Southern Front. In April 1943, it was transferred to the 5th Shock Army, which later became part of the 4th Ukrainian Front. After participation in retaking Yenkiyevo, it was awarded the battle honour. In January 1944, it became part of the 31st Guards Rifle Corps of the 46th Army. In November 1944 it was finally transferred to the 4th Guards Army, which it was part of for the rest of the war. During Operation Konrad I, the 34th Guards were pushed back by battlegroups from the 6th Panzer Division and 8th Panzer Division.

The division was disbanded in May 1946 with the 31st Guards Rifle Corps in the Central Group of Forces.

== Composition ==
On 6 August 1942:

- 103rd Guards Rifle Regiment
- 105th Guards Rifle Regiment
- 107th Guards Rifle Regiment
- 84th Guards Artillery Regiment

== Commanders ==
The following officers commanded the division during World War II:

- Major General Iosif Gubarevich (8 June 1942 – 7 February 1943)
- Colonel Ivan Dryakhlov (10–20 February 1943)
- Colonel Filipp Braylyan (21 February–6 April 1943)
- Lieutenant Colonel Alexey Belmozhin (7 April–12 June 1943)
- Colonel Filipp Braylyan (13 June–8 November 1943; promoted to major general 15 September)
- Major General Grigory Panchenko (9 November–4 December 1943)
- Colonel Kuzma Parfyonov (5 December 1943 – 5 January 1944)
- Major General Filipp Braylyan (6 January – 28 May 1944)
- Colonel Iosif Maksimovich (29 May – 13 October 1944; promoted to major general 13 September)
- Colonel Gerasim Kuks (14 October 1944 – after 9 May 1945)

== Sources ==
- Feskov, V.I.; Golikov, V.I.; Kalashnikov, K.A.; Slugin, S.A. (2013). Вооруженные силы СССР после Второй Мировой войны: от Красной Армии к Советской [The Armed Forces of the USSR after World War II: From the Red Army to the Soviet: Part 1 Land Forces] (in Russian). Tomsk: Scientific and Technical Literature Publishing. ISBN 9785895035306.
- Main Personnel Directorate of the Ministry of Defense of the Soviet Union (1964). Командование корпусного и дивизионного звена советских вооруженных сил периода Великой Отечественной войны 1941 – 1945 гг [Commanders of Corps and Divisions in the Great Patriotic War, 1941–1945] (in Russian). Moscow: Frunze Military Academy.
