= Filipp Braylyan =

Soviet Army major general

Filipp Vasilyevich Braylyan
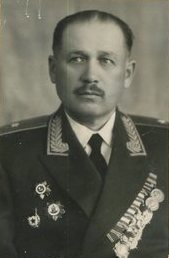
- Braylyan in the 1950s
- Born: 3 July 1901; Tribusovka, Olgopol uyezd, Podolia Governorate, Russian Empire
- Died: 30 July 1973 (aged 72) Vinnytsia, Ukrainian SSR, Soviet Union
- Allegiance: Soviet Union
- Branch: Red Army (Soviet Army from 1946)
- Service years: 1922–1957
- Rank: Major general
- Commands: 349th Rifle Division; 34th Guards Rifle Division
- Conflicts: World War II
- Awards: Order of Lenin

Filipp Vasilyevich Braylyan (Russian: Филипп Васильевич Брайлян; 3 July 1901 – 30 July 1973) was a Soviet Army major general who held divisional commands during World War II.

Conscripted into the Red Army in the early 1920s, Braylyan rose through a series of command and staff positions to regimental command before Germany invaded the Soviet Union. He commanded a regiment in the retreat through Ukraine in 1941 and after breaking out of encirclement was appointed commander of the 349th Rifle Division, which he led in the Barvenkovo–Lozovaya offensive of January 1942. Seriously concussed a few months later, Braylyan was posted to command the 34th Guards Rifle Division in March 1943 after recovering. He led the division in the fighting on the Mius-Front and the advance through the Donbass and Ukraine during 1943 and 1944. After falling ill in May 1944, Braylyan commanded officer training courses until his retirement in the late 1950s.

== Early life and prewar service ==
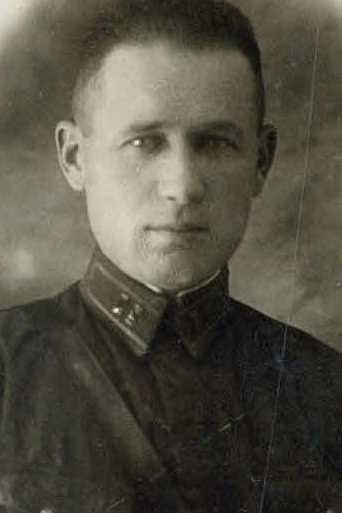
Braylyan, prewar

A Ukrainian, Filipp Vasilyevich Braylyan was born to a family of poor peasants on 3 July 1901 in the village of Tribusovka, Kamyansky volost, Olgopol uyezd, Podolia Governorate. Braylyan had five brothers, including two killed in World War II. His younger brother Fyodor rose to lieutenant colonel in the artillery. He received a fourth grade education. From a young age Braylyan worked as a hired laborer for local landowners and kulaks in his village until 1917, when he began working on his father's farm. Braylyan married local Irina Orishak, who became a teacher, and they had two sons.

Conscripted into the Red Army on 15 August 1922, he was sent to Kharkov, where he served as a Red Army man and ward supervisor at the 2nd Kharkov Military Hospital. Braylyan entered the Kharkov Combined School for Red Starshinas in September 1923. Upon his graduation on 15 September 1926, he was posted to the 299th Rifle Regiment of the 100th Rifle Division of the Ukrainian Military District as a platoon commander. Braylyan rose to commander and politruk (political instructor) of the commandant's platoon of the division headquarters in May 1928, and in November 1929 returned to the 299th Rifle Regiment at Belaya Tserkov, commanding a training platoon and later a machine gun company.

Braylyan was shifted to the division headquarters in Berdichev in May 1932 to become chief of the 4th Staff Section. He was moved up to the 8th Rifle Corps headquarters in Zhitomir in February 1935, receiving the rank of captain when the Red Army introduced personal ranks later that year. With the corps headquarters, Braylyan served as chief of the 2nd and 4th Staff Sections. After completing the Vystrel course between February and July 1937, he was appointed assistant to the chief of the 1st Staff Section of the corps. Braylyan, then a major, rose to senior assistant to the chief of the 1st Staff Section of the 1st (Operations) Department of the headquarters of the Zhitomir Army Group of the Kiev Special Military District on 19 September 1938. He commanded the 286th Rifle Regiment of the 96th Rifle Division from January 1939, leading it in the Soviet invasion of Poland. During the latter, the unit advanced into present-day western Ukraine as part of the 6th Army. The regiment was based in Ustishki-Dolyny after the end of the invasion, and took part in the Soviet occupation of Bessarabia in June 1940, after which it was based at Skole. Braylyan was promoted to lieutenant colonel on 10 October. In December the regiment and its parent division marched to a new base at Vizhnitsa. For his performance during this winter march Braylyan was recommended for an award by division commander Pavel Belov.

== World War II ==
After Germany invaded the Soviet Union, the regiment and its parent 96th Mountain Rifle Division, part of the 17th Rifle Corps of the 12th Army of the Southwestern Front, defended the Soviet border in the region of Seletin in the Carpathians, southwest of Chernovtsy. The division and its parent corps were shifted to the 18th Army of the Southern Front on 26 June. The 96th was ordered to began a retreat on 1 July, and on 6 July its units, crossing the Dniester in the region of Staraya Ushitsa, disengaged from battle, moving towards Kamenets-Podolsk.

The division did not see serious combat again until 15 July, defending in the region of Novaya Ushitsa, Snitkov, and Murovannye Kurilovtsy. Subsequently, the 96th engaged in intense fighting in this region and was forced to retreat under the pressure of superior German forces. From 19 July, the retreating units of the 96th and the 47th Tank Division of the 18th Mechanized Corps took part in fighting in the region of Murafa, covering with withdrawal of the 12th Army to the Nemirov region. Subsequently, Braylyan's regiment and its parent division retreated to the east towards Vapnyarka and then Trostyanets. From late July to early September the 96th defended against the German advance north of Nikolayev. The division was encircled in mid-August and after regrouping its units took Greykovo, allowing the 18th and 9th Armies to break out of the encirclement. For his performance as regimental commander, Braylyan was recommended for the Order of the Red Banner by division commander Ivan Shepetov on 17 March 1942, but was not awarded the award until 26 October 1943. The recommendation read:

During the period of peacetime training Colonel Braylyan put all his strengths and abilities into preparing the combat cohesion of the regiment as a result of which the regiment was the leading unit in the division in all types of exercises.

From he first days of wartime operations, Colonel Braylyan indefatigably, boldly and confidently led the fighting of the regiment and in these actions dealt a crippling blow to the enemy. Thus, the regiment commanded by Comrade Braylyan for the holding of the state border in the region of Seletin from the first days of the Patriotic War solidly held the border on a front of 40 kilometers and in many battles dealt a crippling blow to the enemy.

During the period of fighting on the state border the regiment under the command of Comrade Braylyan wiped out more than 600 soldiers and officers of the Romanian 4th Mountain Brigade and captured four machine guns, two mortars and a significant quantity of other equipment and weapons.

On 6 July 1941 in the region of Kotsman the regiment under the command of Comrade Braylyan accepted battle in unequal conditions - destroyed the enemy and put his remnants to panicked flight, where the enemy left 160 soldiers and officers, twenty trucks with supplies and a significant quantity of other equipment and weapons on the battlefield.

Comrade Braylyan was able to organize the soldiers and commanders to destroy the advancing enemy. Comrade Braylyan personally shot at Romanian and Hungarian infantry with a PPD [submachine gun], rousing the soldiers to the full destruction of the enemy and to feats to the glory of the Homeland.

The regiment commanded by Comrade Braylyan did not know panic or fear before the treacherous enemy.

On 3 August 1941, in battle near Pervomaysk, Comrade Braylyan, seeing that the enemy had superiority in strength and had cut off the crossing, Comrade Braylyan managed to counter with his forces as a result of which the advancing enemy suffered great losses. The regiment made the crossing.

In battle near Novaya Odessa Colonel Braylyan with his regiment beat back the attack of the enemy and retreated to a new line of defense.

On 14 August 1941, at the station of Greykovo, during the breakthrough of the enemy encirclement ring, Comrade Braylyan directed the fighting of not only his regiment but also neighboring units - thanks to this the station of Greykovo was taken, the enemy suffered great losses and left on the battlefield more than 500 soldiers and officers killed, 60 soldiers and officers were taken prisoner, more than 100 vehicles, several guns and mortars and a significant quantity of other equipment and weapons were captured. The ring of the enemy was broken through.

In difficult conditions and nonstop fighting during the retreat from the state border Colonel Braylyan was able to extricate the regiment while preserving its full combat effectiveness. For the duration of all periods of combat operations Colonel Braylyan showed firm steadfastness, ability to direct a regiment in battle, courage and bravery during battle while leading the regiment in the fight. For bold leadership of combat operations, for courage and bravery Colonel Braylyan is deserving of the award of the Order of the Red Banner.

Braylyan took command of the 349th Rifle Division, forming in the North Caucasus Military District at Astrakhan, on 9 September 1941. The new division was mostly composed of local fishermen with prewar military service in territorial units. In late October the 349th was assigned to the 57th Army in the Reserve of the Supreme High Command, then together with the army dispatched to the Southern Front on the Southwestern axis. Braylyan was promoted to colonel on 28 November. In his postwar memoirs, army commander Dmitry Ryabyshev described Braylyan as "energetic, a little hot-tempered and fussy, but an expert at his duties and an exacting leader." Braylyan led the division in the Barvenkovo–Lozovaya Offensive that began on 18 January 1942. Ryabyshev kept the 349th in his reserve before committing it to action on 23 January. In two weeks of fighting the 349th broke through the German defenses and advanced up to 90 kilometers, but the division could not exploit the initial success and went on the defensive. Braylyan's performance in these operations was praised by army commander Kuzma Podlas. During fighting on 28 April, Colonel Braylyan was seriously concussed and hospitalized. Braylyan was medically cleared in November and placed at the disposal of the Main Cadre Directorate awaiting a new assignment. He took command of the 34th Guards Rifle Division on 3 March 1943. The division was assigned to the 31st Guards Rifle Corps on 1 May. In June, corps commander Aleksandr Utvenko gave a mixed evaluation of Braylyan's command performance:

He possesses the qualities of tactical competence, discipline, dependability, and strong will. He prepares the troops for the upcoming battles with the enemy with persistence and urgency.

However, in the units of the division, there is a lack of the required order and low discipline, as a result of which there have been many extraordinary accidents. His measures are insufficient to eliminate these problems.

Conclusion: He is appropriate for his position, but requires significant work and practical assistance from senior superiors.

As part of the corps and its parent 5th Shock Army of the Southern Front, the 34th Guards took part in the fighting on the Mius-Front in the Mius offensive that began on 17 July 1943. Although the offensive was defeated, Utvenko recommended Braylyan for a second Order of the Red Banner on 14 August, which was awarded on 22 August. The recommendation read:

From 1 March 1943 Colonel Braylyan conducted significant work for the cohesion and preparation of units of the 34th Guards Rifle Division for forthcoming battles.

On 17 July 1943 Comrade Braylyan, despite the division being significantly understrength in personnel, skillfully organized and carried out the breakthrough of the strongly fortified zone of the enemy on the western bank of the Mius in the region of the village of Dmitryevka, inflicting heavy losses on the enemy in personnel and equipment, lodging up to 10 kilometers into the depth of the German defense, taking several important commanding heights and eliminating the enemy from the settlement of Stepanovka.

The numerically superior enemy, supported by a significant amount of tanks, methodically counterattacked the units of Comrade Braylyan, up to a hundred aircraft methodically bombed the combat formations of the unit. Comrade Braylyan skillfully and courageously organized the repulse of the enemy attacks and inflicted significant casualties on him.

Being heavily sick with swollen legs, Comrade Braylyan refused to be sent to the hospital for treatment, and remained in the ranks commanding the division.

Braylyan led the division in the Donbass Strategic Offensive of August. In the latter, Braylyan's troops liberated the towns and cities of Yenakiyevo, Yasinovataya, Krasnogorovka, Guliaipole, and Orekhov. For its performance in the liberation of Yenikiyevo the division received the name of the city as an honorific, and Braylyan was promoted to the rank of major general on 15 September. He was decorated with the Order of Kutuzov, 2nd class for his performance in the operation. After the end of the Donbass Offensive, the division and its parent army were shifted to the 4th Ukrainian Front, then the 46th Army of the 3rd Ukrainian Front. Braylyan led the division in the Melitopol offensive, the Battle of the Dnieper and the Soviet campaign in Right-bank Ukraine. As the Odessa Offensive culminated, on 17 April 1944, his division reached the Dniester, capturing a bridgehead on the opposite bank and holding it until relieved by units of the 5th Shock Army.

Braylyan fell sick and went to the hospital on 28 May, and in July was appointed to a rear post as chief of the Infantry Officers Improvement Courses of the Kharkov Military District.

== Postwar ==
After the war, Braylyan continued to serve in his previous position, and on 21 August 1945 the courses were relocated to the Kiev Military District. He received a sharply negative performance evaluation in February 1946, which noted the weak state of his health and recommended he be sent to an improvement course:

During the period of the organization of the courses he did not display resourcefulness and initiative, as a result of which barracks and training resources were not prepared for the reception of students and organization of normal training. The combat training of the students was constantly not at the proper level, and the quality of lessons unsatisfactory. The preparation of officer training staff was not at the center of General Braylyan's attention, as a result of which lessons were uninstructive. General Braylyan rarely personally led classes.

The tactical preparation of General Braylyan is insufficient. He used his practical war experience little, and he does not work enough to improve his military knowledge. General Braylyan requires solid training at the Improvement Courses at the Frunze Academy.

General Braylyan is disciplined, but insufficiently organized and self-possessed. Requests often border on rudeness and over-familiarity.

Politically aware. Morally stable. Often ill. Weak state of health. Loyal to the party of Lenin and Stalin and the Socialist Homeland.

Braylyan was dispatched to the Higher Academic Courses at the Voroshilov Higher Military Academy, which he completed between March 1946 to March 1947. Upon his graduation from the courses, he was appointed chief of the Carpathian Infantry Officers Improvement Courses, renamed the Combined Officers Improvement Courses of the Carpathian Military District in October. He was transferred to serve as chief of the Lvov Inter-District Officers Improvement and Preparation Courses in December 1956. Braylyan was retired at the age of 56 in September 1957, and died in Vinnytsia on 30 July 1973.

== Awards ==
Braylyan was a recipient of the following decorations:

- Order of Lenin
- Order of the Red Banner (4)
- Order of Kutuzov, 2nd class
- Order of the Patriotic War, 1st class
- Medal "For the Victory over Germany in the Great Patriotic War 1941–1945"
