= 106th Rifle Division =

106th Rifle Division (July 16, 1940 – November 28, 1942) 106th Rifle Division (February 5, 1943 – July 1945)
- Active: 1940–1945
- Country: Soviet Union
- Branch: Red Army
- Type: Infantry
- Size: Division
- Engagements: Crimean campaign Battle of Rostov (1941); Barvenkovo–Lozovaya offensive Second Battle of Kharkov; Case Blue; Sevsk-Trubchevsk offensive Oryol offensive Battle of Kursk; Operation Kutuzov; Gomel-Rechytsa offensive Kalinkavichy offensive Kamenets–Podolsky pocket Lvov-Sandomierz Offensive; Vistula–Oder offensive Lower Silesian offensive Battle of Berlin; Battle of Halbe; Prague offensive
- Decorations: Order of the Red Banner; Order of Suvorov (both 2nd Formation)
- Battle honours: Transbaikal; Dniepr (both 2nd Formation)

Commanders
- Notable commanders: Kombrig Mitrofan Sergeevich Tkachev; Col. Aleksei Nikolaevich Pervushin; Lt. Col. Vasilii Lukich Savchenko; Col. Nikolai Georgievich Lyashchenko; Maj. Gen. Semyon Ivanovich Donskov; Maj. Gen. Fyodor Nikandrovich Smekhotvorov; Col. Mikhail Markovich Vlasov; Maj. Gen. Zakhar Trofimovich Trofimov; Col. Grigorii Matveevich Kochenov; Maj. Gen. Emilyan Ivanovich Vasilenko

The 106th Rifle Division was first formed as an infantry division of the Red Army in July 1940 in the North Caucasus Military District, based on the shtat (table of organization and equipment) of the previous September. In May 1941 it was assigned to the Odessa Military District, where it deployed in and around Yevpatoria in Crimea. Two days after the start of the German invasion it became part of the 9th Rifle Corps, which was subordinated to 51st Army in August. This Army was responsible for the defense of the Crimea, with just two regular divisions, including the 106th, initially on strength. The German 11th Army began its attack on September 24; the division was on the Army's right flank south of the Chonhar Strait but was soon partially committed to the main battle on the Isthmus of Perekop. When this position was broken in late October the division began a long retreat to the Kerch Strait and then across to the Taman Peninsula, where it was assigned to 56th Army of Southern Front. Under these commands it took part in the follow-up operations after the liberation of Rostov-na-Donu, and after a short time under direct Front command was assigned to 57th Army deep inside the Izium salient. Before the start of Southwestern Front's offensive to retake Kharkiv the 106th was moved to 9th Army, still in Southern Front. In 1st Panzer Army's counteroffensive that began on May 17 the division was encircled but soon broke out at a considerable cost in casualties and equipment. 9th Army was again badly beaten up in fighting near Izium in June and stood little chance against a full-blown panzer offensive on the Caucasian steppes. With much of the rest of the Army the 106th was encircled near Millerovo in late July and largely destroyed, being disbanded in September.

The second formation of the 106th was based on a division recruited from NKVD personnel in the Transbaikal Military District in November 1942. In February 1943 it was one of six such divisions that came under Red Army control as part of the new 70th Army, which was soon assigned to the reformed Central Front. During February and March, after concentrating near Kursk, it pushed toward Oryol, but this objective was not reached, in part due to ineffective Army leadership. It remained in this area through the spring and early summer, preparing for the German offensive that began in July, but played little active role in the fighting. Shortly after it took part in the campaign that drove German 9th Army out of the Oryol salient, before advancing through eastern Ukraine and into Belarus under 65th Army. In mid-October the division made a major crossing of the Dniepr River in the vicinity of Loyew and was awarded the river's name as a battle honor, while 38 men, including the divisional commander, were made Heroes of the Soviet Union. During November and December it took part in several operations in the swampy terrain of southeastern Belarus before being sent south to 1st Ukrainian Front west of Kyiv; it would remain in this Front for the duration of the war. It came under 13th Army for a few months, but in April 1944 it was reassigned to 3rd Guards Army, where it would also remain for the duration. In August, for its role in penetrating the German defenses in front of Lviv, the 106th was awarded the Order of the Red Banner. As the campaign continued it forced a bridgehead across the Vistula River where it suffered considerable casualties in a late August counterattack. In January 1945 to broke out of the bridgehead and rapidly advanced across southern Poland and into Silesia, where it took part in fighting through February, arriving at the Neisse River in the third week of the month. From this line it attacked into the German heartland in April, first taking part in routing the German Cottbus grouping, and then the encirclement battle against the 9th Army in the Spree Forest. When the German surrender came it was advancing with its Front toward Prague. Shortly after hostilities ceased it was awarded the Order of Suvorov for the battle with 9th Army. As with many other distinguished divisions it was disbanded a few months later.

== 1st Formation ==
The division officially formed on July 16, 1940, from troops stationed around the North Caucasus Military District. Kombrig Mitrofan Sergeevich Tkachev was appointed to command the same day; this cavalry officer had most recently served as deputy commander of the 10th Cavalry Division. In November he was sent to the Frunze Military Academy for training, and returned in May, 1941 just as the 106th was moving to the Odessa Military District, where it took up positions on the west coast of Crimea, based on Yevpatoria. On June 22 its order of battle was as follows:

- 397th Rifle Regiment
- 442nd Rifle Regiment
- 534th Rifle Regiment
- 553rd Artillery Regiment (until July 3, 1942)
- 201st Antitank Battalion
- 430th Antiaircraft Battery (later 449th Antiaircraft Battalion)
- 167th Reconnaissance Company (later 167th Reconnaissance Battalion)
- 156th Sapper Battalion
- 500th Signal Battalion
- 143rd Medical/Sanitation Battalion
- 77th Chemical Defense (Anti-gas) Company
- 197th Motor Transport Company (later 197th Motor Transport Battalion)
- 145th Motorized Field Bakery
- 16th Divisional Veterinary Hospital
- 734th Field Postal Station (later 650th)
- 37th Field Office of the State Bank

At this time the division had some 12,000 personnel in its ranks. On June 24, in accordance with STAVKA Order No. 20466, the 106th was subordinated to the 9th Separate Rifle Corps, along with the 156th Rifle Division and the 32nd Cavalry Division. The Corps had a strength of about 35,000 personnel, all under command of Lt. Gen. P. I. Batov, and was tasked with defending the Crimea and preparing for amphibious operations elsewhere in the Black Sea. Tkachev left the division on July 1; he would later lead the 243rd Rifle Division for two brief periods in 1944 but was forced to leave due to the effects of wounds. He was replaced by Col. Aleksei Nikolaevich Pervushin, who had been serving as deputy commander of the 156th. On August 20 9th Corps was subordinated to 51st Army.

== Defense of Crimea ==
51st Army, with a strength of some 95,000, was placed under command of Col. Gen. F. I. Kuznetsov, who began preparing a defense of the Isthmus of Perekop in mid-August with most of his assigned forces, apart from 9th Corps, still en route. Roughly 30,000 civilians were drafted into building defenses alongside the Red Army troops on the Perekop and the Chongar Peninsula. His deployment was badly affected by faulty intelligence from the STAVKA in General Staff Order No. 001033 of August 18 which stated in part:

According to information from the English military mission, the Germans are preparing sea [amphibious] operations against the Crimea in the most immediate future, while concentrating amphibious assault transports in Bulgarian and Romanian ports. The amphibious assault operation will be supported by airborne forces...

In fact, the Axis had no amphibious capability to speak of, and the German airborne force had been devastated on Crete in May, so it was odd that this information was given credence. It led Kuznetsov to deploy 40,000 troops to defend the coast against landings that were effectively impossible, while a further 25,000 were in the Crimean interior on anti-paratroop duty. Just 30,000 were left to defend the northern approaches, including 7,000 of the 156th at Perekop.

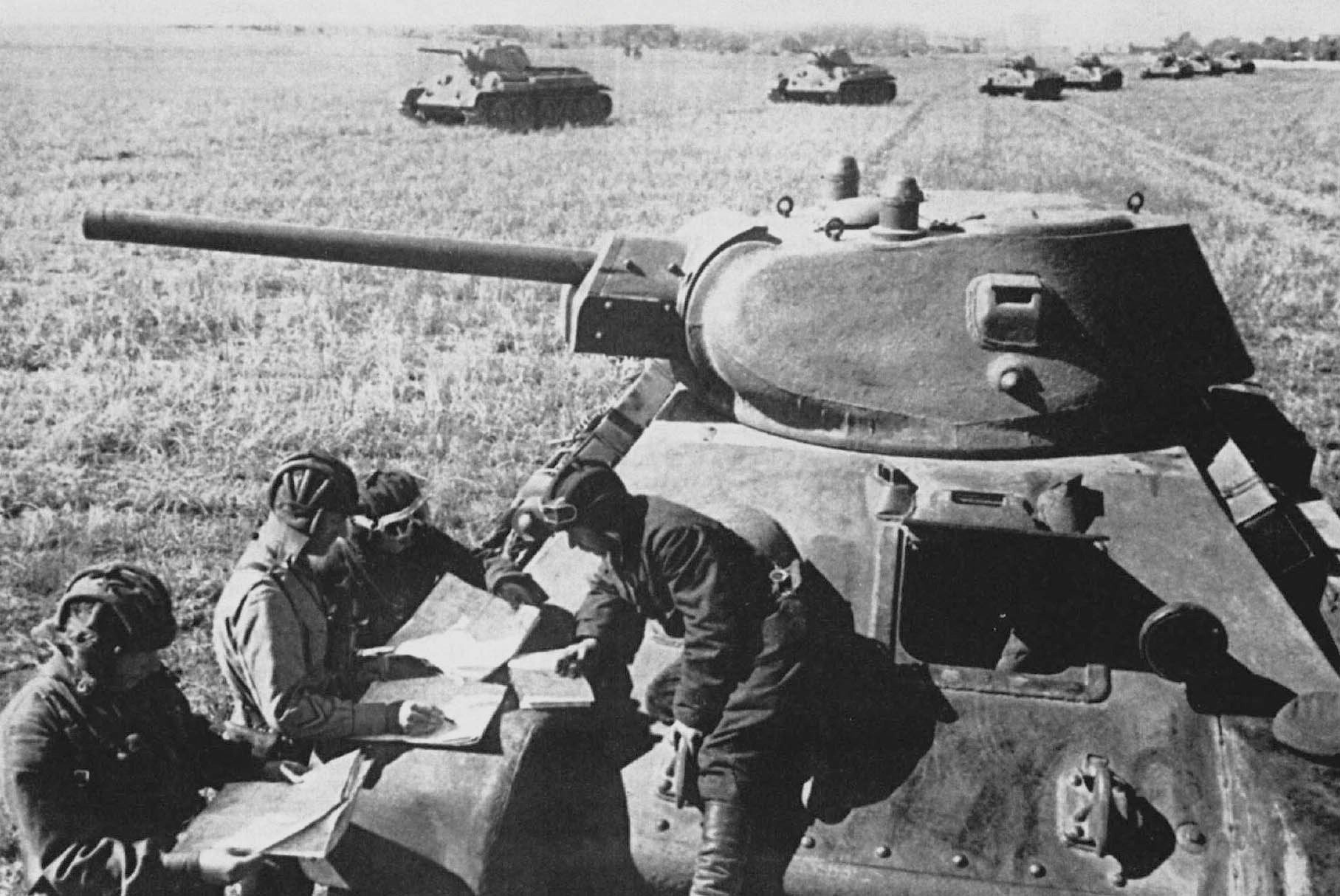
Maj. S. P. Baranov issues orders to officers of 5th Tank Regiment

The Army was not initially assigned any tanks, so Southern Front managed to scrape up ten T-34s and 56 T-37s from repair facilities to form the 5th Tank Regiment under command of Maj. S. P. Baranov, giving Kuznetsov a small mobile reserve. On August 30 the German 11th Army forced a crossing of the Dniepr River at Beryslav in the face of resistance from Southern Front's 9th Army. The attackers broke out on September 9–10, forcing a shattered 9th Army back toward Melitopol and opening the approaches to the Crimea. The 11th Army commander, Gen. E. Ritter von Schobert, directed his LIV Army Corps toward Perekop, without any clear idea of what that force would face; in fact German intelligence had not yet identified 51st Army. Schobert directed the Corps commander, Gen. E. Hansen, to form a forward detachment in an effort to take the Perekop by coup de main, just before Schobert was killed in an air crash on September 12. Gen. E. von Manstein was appointed by Hitler as his successor, but he would not arrive for five days.

On the day of Schobert's death the reconnaissance battalion of Leibstandarte SS Adolf Hitler, under command of Sturmbannführer K. Meyer, made a 35km dash from Beryslav toward Perekop, followed by the 22nd Reconnaissance Battalion, and reached the village of Preobrazhenka, 8km north of the ancient Tatar Wall, at around 0600 hours. Meyer's force consisted of motorcycle infantry, a few armored cars, and a battery of towed Pak 36 antitank guns, but no engineers and no other heavy weapons. As it entered the village his lead company took 76mm artillery fire from the armored train Voykovets as well as small arms fire from the 156th's 361st Rifle Regiment entrenched at the nearby Chervonyi Chaban Sovkhoz. Meyer could see that extensive fortifications continued to the south and as he retreated he reported back to Hansen that "coup against Perekop impossible."

=== Battle of Perekop ===
Manstein arrived at Mykolaiv on September 17 and found that Hansen had moved up his 46th and 73rd Infantry Divisions toward the Perekop but had not attempted to reduce the Soviet defenses. Furthermore, XXX Army Corps had sealed off the Chonhar and the Arabat Spit with Leibstandarte but had also made no effort to push into the Crimea. The 156th had constructed three defensive lines across the Perekop, with the main line making use of the Tatar Wall. The Wall itself was fronted by the old moat, now 12m deep and 33m wide; the Wall sat on 5m-high earthen berm. The surrounding countryside was barren of trees and other vegetation, completely open to Soviet observation. Most concerning for the attackers, however, was the extensive employment of antipersonnel mines, including thousands of wooden PMDs which could not be found by conventional detectors, plus improvised devices including aerial bombs and naval mines. Remote-control buried flamethrowers were also in service. Overall, the German Army had not had to penetrate such a defence to date in the war.

Manstein was keen to avoid a frontal assault and set 11th Army's engineers to find some way to bypass these lines. One possibility was cross the shallow Syvash as had been done by the Red Army in 1920, but due to the tidal conditions and soft bottom at this time German engineers trying to wade across quickly sank to their hips. The use of Sturmbooten was also considered, but rejected. In addition, Kuznetsov was expecting this move and had ordered the 156th to deploy two battalions on the Litovskii Peninsula where the 1920 crossing had occurred. On the Chonhar the railroad bridge had been destroyed and obstacles placed in the water below, while the Arabat was so long, narrow and exposed that it could only be crossed if unopposed.

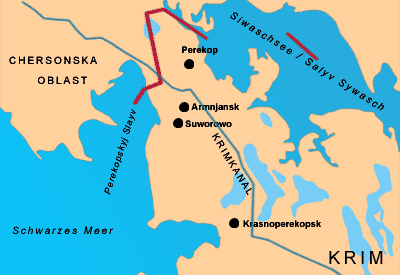
The Isthmus of Perekop. Note locations of Armiansk (Arminjansk) and Ishun (Krasnoperekopsk).

Facing the prospect of a frontal assault, Manstein took steps to add combat multipliers to his forces, including the scant armor and heavy artillery available. The artillery preparation began at 0500 hours on September 24 with over 2,500 rounds fired, as well as limited air support. At 0730 the assault groups of 46th and 73rd Infantry moved to attack the outer defenses of the 156th, meeting the 2nd Battalion of the 361st Rifle Regiment. The German engineers led the attack, breaching the obstacle belt and creating a bridgehead at the cost of heavy losses. Gradually the 2nd Battalion was wiped out piece by piece, with the Sovkhoz strongpoint overrun after being bombed by Ju 88s. The attack cost the German 213th Infantry Regiment 770 casualties, including four company commanders. Manstein had directed the 22nd Infantry Division and Leibstandarte to make diversionary actions at Chonhar and the Syvash, but Kuznetsov disregarded them. Correctly convinced that the true attack was being made at the Perekop he ordered the 106th to send its 442nd Rifle Regiment to replace the 156th's losses.

The attack resumed at dawn on September 25, as the 46th and 73rd Divisions mopped up the advance battalions of the 361st Regiment. They were now nearing the main defense line at the Tatar Wall, and the 530th Regiment of the 156th, plus the 5th Tank Regiment, were sent in to counterattack. This was a failure, and the 156th had now lost about a third of its infantry. The assault on the Tatar Wall began on the morning of September 26 with a massive artillery preparation as well as dive bombing from Ju 87s. Despite spirited resistance, by 1030 the defense of the 156th was collapsing, and soon broke completely west of Fort Perekop. German storm groups pushed through the gap and reached as far as Armiansk where they began house-to-house fighting with remnants of the 156th which were dug in at a brick factory.

By 1100 hours the two German divisions were over the Wall in strength. Kuznetsov now committed Group Batov of three rifle regiments (the 422nd and two others) to counterattack, and despite a lack of artillery support, forced the 46th Infantry back to the Wall, while the 73rd was forced out of Armiansk. At this point General Hansen replied with a battlegroup of 50th Infantry Division, recently arrived from Odesa. Along with timely air support this tipped the fighting in German favor. By dusk all of Armiansk was back in their hands, and while the eastern part of the Wall was still held by elements of the 156th, Kuznetsov had no further reserves and little to prevent Hansen from advancing on the reserve line at Ishun.

The STAVKA had expected Kuznetsov to hold the Tatar Wall far longer, if not indefinitely, and ordered him to continue counterattacking. Group Batov retook most of Armiansk early on September 27, forcing the 73rd Infantry back to the brick factory where it held on the rest of the day. Meanwhile, German engineers, under costly artillery fire, were building a 16-tonne wooden bridge over the western part of the Tatar Ditch, allowing several StuG IIIs to cross. These, in support of 50th Infantry and with Ju 87s overhead, retook most of Armiansk. Batov made a further effort at dawn the next day in company with Baranov's T-34s, some of which reached the Wall, while the riflemen again occupied the town. But Group Batov had now shot its bolt and late in the evening Armiansk changed hands yet again. Kuznetsov now pleaded for permission to pull back to Ishun, and while the STAVKA had grave, and justified, doubts about his leadership abilities it authorized the withdrawal, which was covered by Baranov's tankers over the next few days, with only one vehicle lost. While LIV Corps had taken considerable casualties, especially among its junior officers, and had a good deal of equipment destroyed, it claimed 10,019 prisoners taken, along with 32 tanks and 68 artillery pieces. As most of these were from the 156th, the division had been largely destroyed in the fighting.

=== Battle of Ishun ===
51st Army now gained a reprieve as Manstein was forced to react to a crisis west of Melitopol. The STAVKA was also forced to react to the situation in the Crimea by abandoning Odesa, which it had been successfully holding. Kuznetsov soon received the 157th Rifle Division at Sevastopol, and by mid-October the Separate Coastal Army had been delivered by the Black Sea Fleet almost intact. Kuznetsov would need these forces to hold at Ishun; his Army still had some 50,000 personnel, but after deducting forces covering Chonhar and the Syvash only 15,000-20,000 were available, many being militiamen of 1st and 2nd Crimean Divisions. German reconnaissance was learning that the position at Ishun was nearly as formidable as that at the Perekop. The small town had three large salt lakes and the Black Sea on its flanks, leaving just three potential routes to the south, the widest of which, along the rail line, spanned just 1,300m. The landscape was equally barren and flat, as well as being marshy. This sector was assigned to what remained of the 361st Regiment, a battalion of 172nd Rifle Division, and a pair of naval infantry battalions. The 106th and 271st Rifle Divisions held between Lake Krasnoe and the Syvash, as Kuznetsov continued to fear a crossing operation on this flank. Baranov still had nine T-34s operational, but artillery support was much reduced, consisting mostly of older 76mm guns. The Voykovets would soon be joined by the Smyert fashizmu armored train.

11th Army was now tasked exclusively with the conquest of the Crimea, but was also reduced to just six divisions. Since maneuver was impossible, Manstein chose to mislead Kuznetsov by attacking on all three axes, beginning in the east with the 22nd Infantry before shifting to the west with the 73rd; the 46th would conduct holding attacks in the center. Artillery was still in short supply, so air support would be more essential than before. The preparation began at 0600 hours on October 18 and lasted two hours. On the east flank two battalions of the 22nd's 65th Infantry Regiment, led by Col. E. Haccius, waded through 460m of shallow water and took the 106th's 442nd Regiment by surprise, tearing apart Kuznetsov's right flank. However, the 397th Rifle Regiment, dug in on the Tumulus Assis burial mound, stopped two further battalions cold, with heavy losses, when they attempted a frontal attack over open ground. The German infantry faced a choke point some 1.5km wide with marshy lakes on each flank. Nebelwerfers delivered a smoke screen but the Soviet machine gunners simply fired through the smoke. Meanwhile, the regiment's 82mm mortars laid down a barrage of fire in front of the barbed wire belt. Soviet artillery provided effective support, as did the armored trains. The 1st Battalion of the 47th Infantry Regiment lost its commander killed and two company commanders wounded and was forced to ground. The commander of the 22nd now made the classic mistake of reinforcing failure by committing the second battalion, which suffered the same fate. Despite its success against the 422nd, the 22nd Infantry suffered 685 casualties during the day.

The tables turned considerably on October 19. The depleted 47th Regiment was ordered to attack the Tumulus Assis again, and its commander chose his 3rd Battalion, now backed by a battery of StuG IIIs, pioneers, and a platoon of 20mm antiaircraft guns to suppress the machine gunners of the 397th. The Germans advanced in small assault teams, eventually crossing the barbed wire and getting close enough to suppress some of the advance Soviet positions with automatic weapons and grenades. Once Colonel Pervushin realized this defense was compromised he ordered the Tumulus abandoned. Although the 22nd Infantry had scored two important successes the 106th and the 271st could easily fall back to several other good defensive positions on the isthmus. However, German attacks on the western end of the line had broken through the defenses there and by the evening 51st Army was near the breaking point. At this critical juncture the lead element of Coastal Army, the 157th Division, began arriving from Sevastopol.

On the morning of October 20 two regiments of the 157th attacked Ishun with artillery support and Baranov's remaining T-34s. The 73rd Infantry was forced out of the town, but this brought the 157th out into the open where it was struck with artillery and air attacks, bringing it to a halt before the 73rd counterattacked and retook Ishun. Heavy rain ended the fighting and the two sides exchanged attacks over the next day with little result. Kuznetsov was relieved of command on October 22; oddly enough the STAVKA now placed Vice-Adm. G. I. Levchenko in charge of all land, air and naval forces in the Crimea. Levchenko sent in a large scale counterattack on the morning of October 24, using the evacuated units from Odesa and the remnants of 51st Army, now under Batov. While the 73rd was short on riflemen it still had plenty of machine guns and mortars, which caused heavy casualties to the attackers, and the effort failed. A further attack was mounted the next day but the losses were too great. Hansen sensed a weakness and committed the fresh 170th Infantry Division south of Ishun and the Soviet defense began to collapse. On October 26 Manstein reinforced success with the 132nd Infantry Division and by the end of the day most of 51st Army was retreating in disorder, although some units continued to hold on to strongpoints. 11th Army had won the battles for the Perekop, at the cost of over 12,000 casualties, but 51st and Coastal Armies had lost some 25 percent, including 16,000 prisoners taken at Ishun. The 51st had also lost roughly 200 artillery pieces.

==== Retreat to Kerch ====
Batov led his defeated Army toward Dzhankoi, hoping to link up with the 276th Rifle Division which had been guarding the south side of the Chonhar. Efforts to establish rearguards were mostly knocked aside before they could dig in, leading to more men being captured. 46th Infantry burst into Dzhankoi before a defense was organized and the retreat became a rout. In the first days of November Levchenko directed Batov to take up pre-constructed positions at the Parpach Narrows near Ak-Monai. While at this point only 17km separated the Black Sea and the Sea of Azov, this was too long a line for the battered 51st, although it held for three days before XXXXII Army Corps forced it to continue to retreat to Kerch. Although the STAVKA belatedly sent reinforcements to hold the city the logistical position was impossible and orders were issued on November 13 to evacuate to the Taman peninsula. By dawn on November 17 the small craft of the Azov Flotilla had carried the last of Batov's troops across the Kerch strait. Surprisingly, under the circumstances, the 106th still had 5,481 personnel on strength.

By the start of December the division had been assigned to 56th Army in Southern Front. Colonel Pervushin was given command of 44th Army on December 16 and four days later he handed the 106th over to Col. Dmitrii Petrovich Monakhov. Pervushin would be promoted to the rank of major general on New Year's Day, but on January 15 he was severely wounded, being hospitalized until August 1943, and never held another field command. Monakhov left the division on December 29 and was replaced by Lt. Col. Vasilii Lukich Savchenko. By now the 106th was operating along the north shore of the Sea of Azov following the liberation of Rostov-na-Donu on December 2.

== Second Battle of Kharkiv ==
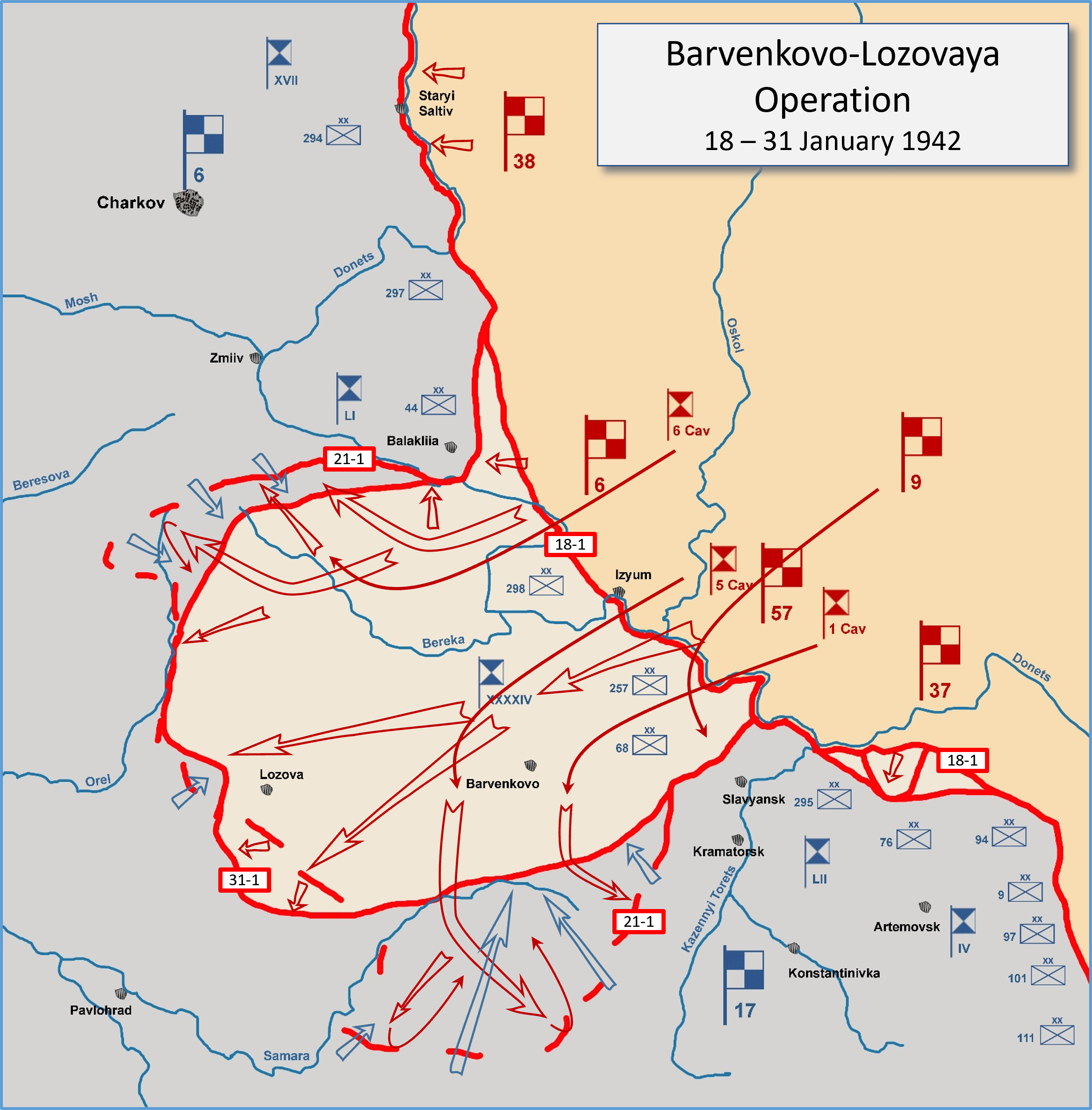
Barvenkovo-Lozovaya Operation. Note position and advance of 57th Army.

During January 1942 the division was moved to direct command of Southern Front, and a month later was transferred to 57th Army of the same Front. On March 6 Lt. Colonel Savchenko passed his command to Col. Nikolai Georgievich Lyashchenko, who had most recently been deputy commander of the 255th Rifle Division. He would remain in command until the 1st formation was disbanded. By the beginning of May the 106th was part of 9th Army, still in Southern Front.

Beginning on January 18 the combined forces of 57th, 9th, and 6th Armies of Southern and Southwestern Fronts had struck German positions near Izium and torn a large hole at a time when all German reserves were involved in the fighting west of Moscow. Mobile forces, including cavalry and ski troops, pushed deep into the German rear. The important rail hubs of Barvinkove and Lozova were taken, but Army Group South was able to use superior mobility to block or halt the Soviet advance by January 31 short of its planned objectives. However, the Soviet Armies were left holding a large salient that potentially threatened both the Donbas to the south and Kharkiv to the north.

On April 28 the Military Council of the Southwestern Direction, under command of Marshal S. K. Timoshenko, issued its Directive No. 00275 for an offensive to retake Kharkiv. The southern springboard for the offensive, timed for May 4, would be the northern half of the Izium salient. Southwestern Front would conduct the actual attack, while Southern Front, led by Lt. Gen. R. Ya. Malinovskii, would protect the offensive's south flank with his 57th and 9th Armies. This protection was weakened as Timoshenko removed assets, including a rifle division, two rifle brigades, plus armor and artillery, to reinforce the offensive. Malinovskii was left with 11 divisions, including the 106th, and one brigade, to cover a front of 176km. The divisions averaged between 5,000 - 7,000 personnel. 9th Army itself had six divisions and one brigade, supported by two tank brigades and five regiments of artillery, spread over 96km. The 106th, along with the 335th, 341st, and 349th Rifle Divisions, served strictly on defense in the Army's center and right flank. The 106th was deployed almost due south of Barvinkove, facing the 100th Jäger Division of 17th Army's III Panzer Corps. Given the frontages involved the defenses were built around a system of strongpoints and resistance centers; there were no second echelons or reserves at the divisional or army levels and the depth of the tactical defense was not greater than 4km. Engineer obstacles were scant and poorly prepared.

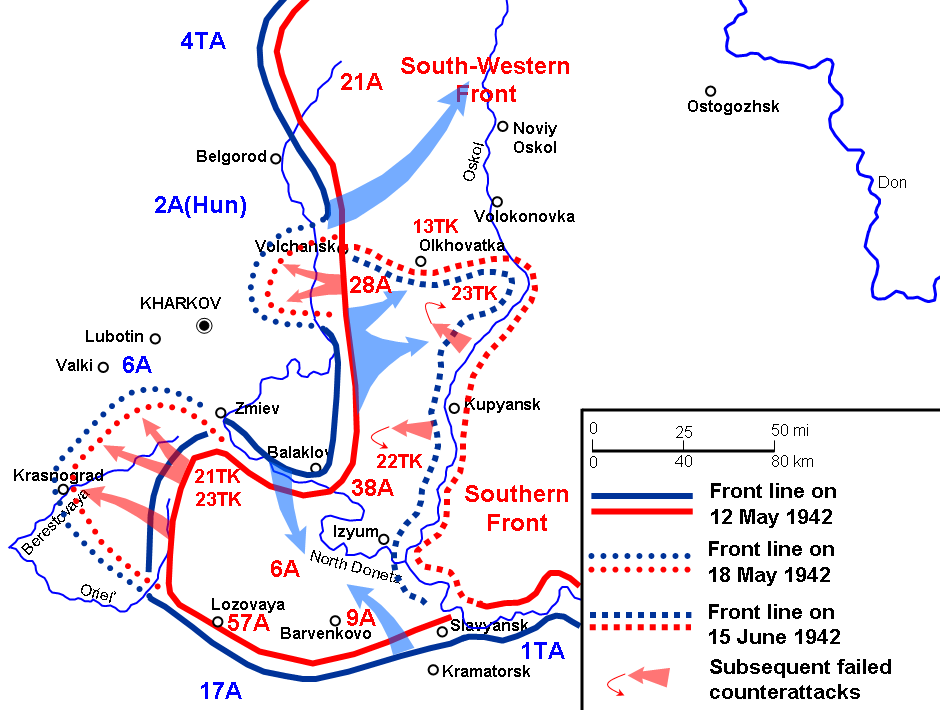
Second Battle of Kharkiv. Note position of 9th Army.

In the event the start of the offensive was postponed to May 12. 6th Army and Army Group Bobkin, which comprised the southern shock group inside the salient, broke German resistance on a front of 42km and advanced up to 15km, reaching the second defensive line along the Oryol River. The offensive continued successfully the next day, and the entire German defense was penetrated in the direction of Krasnograd. During May 14 the Soviet forces continued to advance into the depths, up to 40km from the start line on a front of 55km. The commander of Army Group South, Field Marshal F. von Bock, was ready to abandon the German offensive that had been planned before the Soviet offensive began in favor of blocking 6th Army. However, the situation east of Kharkiv, while complex, was far less threatening, and the Army Group continued to prepare for a counterstroke along the Izium–Barvinkove axis.

=== German counteroffensive ===
On the morning of May 17 this counterstroke was unleashed. In the 20km-wide sector from Petrovka to Golubovka the III Panzer Corps concentrated five infantry regiments in the front line as well as 170 tanks of the 14th Panzer Division to strike the junction of the 106th and 341st Divisions. This was just one of several such concentrations aimed at 9th Army. By attacking on narrow sectors the German command created significant superiority of forces, especially in tanks and artillery. The attackers enveloped obstacles and strongpoints and by 0900 hours 9th Army's front had been penetrated between both the 106th and 341st and between 335th and 51st Rifle Division. 14th Panzer had advanced up to 14km toward Barvinkove. By 1300 the Army commander, Maj. Gen. F. M. Kharitonov, had moved his command post without the knowledge or consent of Malinovskii, and would lose his command three days later.

During the early afternoon elements of the division put up a valiant defense:

The Fascists burst through to Barvenkovo. Up to an infantry regiment with 14 tanks attacked the 8th Company of 442nd Regiment (106th Rifle Division). Soviet forces, headed by officer Minaevskii, commander of 8th Company, fought steadfastly, repelling the enemy's fierce attack. The enemy, having lost eight tanks, did not achieve success, and in the afternoon began to envelop 8th Company from the direction of Vikino.

Barvinkove, apart from its northwestern section, was lost by the 333rd Rifle Division and units of the 34th Cavalry Division at around 1700 hours. After this the German force moved eastward along both banks of the Sukhyi Torets River. 34th Cavalry pulled back north of the river and by dusk formed a line, along with several subunits of the 106th, from Severkh. Ilichevka to Krasnozorevka to Grigorovka, covering the road to Izium. A 20km-wide gap had also been opened between 9th Army and 57th Army to the west. Communications between Southern Front's headquarters and 9th Army were only reestablished at midnight. In all, the German operations this day were a major success, leaving the survivors of 9th Army in a state of shock.

Timoshenko had ordered a counterattack for May 18 by 14th Guards Rifle Division plus the 2nd and 5th Cavalry Corps to restore the situation, but the cavalry was already fighting defensively and Kharitonov was out of touch with all his forces. The 106th by now was encircled east of Barvinkove with the 335th and 349th Divisions and the remainder of 5th Cavalry; the combined force set up a defense from Novokamyshevakha to Kopanki, By 1000 hours German forces had taken the southern part of Izium, and the German command turned its fresh 389th Infantry Division from second echelon against the encircled grouping. Overnight the grouping moved eastward toward the Northern Donets River on its own initiative and managed to cross to the left bank at dawn, with heavy losses. During May 21 the III Panzer Corps bypassed the 106th as it struck north toward Balakliia to link up with LI Army Corps and cut off the 6th and 57th Armies. This junction took place the next day, by which time the 106th had been withdrawn to positions northeast of Izium. By May 28 the last of some 22,000 Red Army soldiers managed to escape from the pocket.

== Case Blue ==
As of June 22 the rebuilding 106th was still to the southeast of Izium, between the 343rd and 51st Divisions. Von Bock now launched a preliminary offensive, designated Fridericus II, in preparation for the main summer campaign. The objectives were Izium as well as Kupiansk on the Oskil River. Three army corps of 1st Panzer Army along with III Panzer Corps would strike 9th Army and the 38th Army to its north. XXXXIV Army Corps, with the 97th and 101st Jäger Divisions, would strike north, bypassing Izium en route to Gorokhovatka. The objective was to encircle and destroy as much of the two Soviet armies as possible west of the Oskil.

9th Army was now under command of Maj. Gen. D. N. Nikishov. He deployed the 106th and 343rd to defend Izium itself. After several delays due to heavy thunderstorms the offensive began at 0410 hours. By late afternoon on June 24 the German pincers had met at Gorokhovatka, but although 1st Panzer Army claimed 22,800 prisoners, the bulk of the two Armies had escaped across the Oskil. The 106th, being relatively close to the river, remained largely intact, but 5th Cavalry Corps, which had been deployed in the front line, took such heavy losses that it would be disbanded on July 15. By July 1 the 9th Army had been transferred to Southwestern Front.

=== Retreat and disbandment ===
The OKH began the second stage of Operation Blau on July 6. After a headlong advance on limited fuel, the next day the 3rd Panzer Division reached the Kalitva River at Rossosh, seizing bridges and even part of Southwestern Front's headquarters. The day previous the STAVKA had authorized a general withdrawal by the Front, according to which 9th Army was to pull back to a new line from Belokurakino to Mostki to Kremennaya. As the left-flank (southern) unit of the Front, the 9th was ordered to hold this line firmly in order to cover the evacuation of industrial plant in and around Lysychansk. At dawn on July 8, Army Group South became aware of the withdrawal of 9th and 38th Armies and ordered the infantry on the right wing of 1st Panzer to begin a pursuit across the Oskil and Northern Donets. The forces of XI and XXXXIV Corps crossed both to reach the Krasna, defended by the 9th and part of the 38th. 1st Panzer now shifted the III and XIV Panzer Corps to the same axis to break through between the two Soviet Fronts. The 9th had five rifle divisions in first echelon, plus three more, including the 106th, and two antitank brigades in second echelon or reserve. The new Army commander, Lt. Gen. A. I. Lopatin, also had the depleted 5th Cavalry Corps and roughly 65 tanks available.

The German attack came at daybreak on July 9. Lysychansk was taken the next day, and soon most of 38th Army and one division of the 9th had been encircled between the Aidar and Chertkovo Rivers. On July 12 Southwestern Front ordered Lopatin to withdraw his remaining forces southward to join Southern Front's retreat to the Don River. Meanwhile, both panzer corps pushed the rearguards of 9th and 38th Armies while also outflanking the supposed "final" defense line of Southern Front. By July 17, 9th Army was still making a hasty withdrawal to the south. Two days later it was pocketed, along with much of 24th and 37th Armies, south of Millerovo, and was fighting to escape along the Glubokaya River. In the effort to break out much of the remaining strength of the 106th was destroyed. It is listed as "reorganizing" in the Caucasus region on August 1, but after two months of constant retreat from panzers and infantry there was little left to organize and it was effectively disbanded on September 11, although it officially remained on the books until November 28.

Colonel Lyashchenko went on to a distinguished career, leading the 90th Rifle Division for most of the rest of the war, a mechanized division and a pair of corps in the 1950s, and commanding several military districts until 1977 when he joined the group of Inspector-Generals of the Ministry of Defence. He was made a Hero of the Soviet Union on October 4, 1990 and retired with the rank of Army General in May 1992 before his death in 2000 at the age of 90.

== 2nd Formation ==
The second formation of the division began on November 23, 1942, as the Transbaikal Rifle Division, at Chita in the Transbaikal Military District. The personnel were largely NKVD troops from the Mongolian border and the equipment was from the Ural Military District. Its first commander, NKVD Maj. Gen. Semyon Ivanovich Donskov, was appointed on the same day; this officer had previously led the 1st NKVD and the 268th Rifle Divisions. The division's order of battle was as follows:

- 43rd "Darasun" Rifle Regiment
- 188th "Argun" Rifle Regiment
- 236th "Nerchinsk" Rifle Regiment
- 362nd "Transbaikal" Artillery Regiment
- 63rd Antitank Battalion
- 60th Reconnaissance Company
- 12th Sapper Battalion
- 500th Signal Battalion (later 652nd Signal Company)
- 65th Medical/Sanitation Battalion
- 11th Chemical Defense (Anti-gas) Company
- 319th Motor Transport Company
- 49th Field Bakery
- 734th Divisional Veterinary Hospital
- 2246th Field Postal Station
- 1762nd Field Office of the State Bank

The NKVD began forming the division, and three others, to serve as NKVD rifle divisions prior to being authorized by the Commissar of Defense on December 7. The division was passed to Red Army control as the 106th on February 5, 1943, and it entered the active army ten days later. It retained the name "Transbaikal" as an honorific.

As with the other NKVD divisions, the 106th was assigned to the 70th Army in the Central Front, under the terms of this decree issued by Marshal G. K. Zhukov:

"The Stavka of the Supreme High Command orders:

1. Name the Separate Army formed by the People's Commissariat of Internal Affairs of the USSR, consisting of six rifle divisions, with separate reinforcing and support units, the 70th Army and include it in the Red Army on 1 February.
2. Give the formations of the 70th Army the following designations:

- The 102nd Far Eastern Rifle Division,
- The 106th Trans-Baikal Rifle Division,
- The 140th Siberian Rifle Division,
- The 162nd Central Asian Rifle Division,
- The 175th Ural Rifle Division,
- The 181st Stalingrad Rifle Division

3. Determine the numbering and table of organization and composition of the units of 70th Army in accordance with the instructions of the Chief of the Red Army Glavupraform."

The 106th had already loaded aboard trains and was moving west.

=== Sevsk-Trubchevsk Offensive ===
70th Army was assigned to the re-deploying Don Front (soon re-designated Central Front) under command of Col. Gen. K. K. Rokossovskii. It took some time before Rokossovskii could knock it into shape as a front-line formation, forcing him to remove many senior, ex-NKVD officers. Rokossovskii had received detailed instructions from the STAVKA early on February 6, directing him to, among other things, concentrate 70th Army's units by February 14 in the Volovo, Dolgorukovo, and Livny areas as they arrived and then send them off in the wake of the Front's first echelon. In the event, this deployment schedule was impossible to meet, due to shortages of rolling stock, damage to the rails themselves, and winter weather, so the start of Central Front's offensive was postponed until February 25.

At the same time, Rokossovskii made changes in his operational plan. In the first phase, Central Front would break through the German line from Nikolskoe to Karmanovo to Mashkino to Olshanka with the objective of reaching the rail line from Bryansk to Konotop. After this, the axis of the attack would be toward Sevsk and Unecha Station to cut the line from Bryansk to Gomel. This first phase would require covering up to 250km through deep snow and with a paucity of roads. 70th Army would join in the second phase, with the objective of capturing Mogilev by March 28 after concentrating in the Kursk area on February 23. These ambitious objectives proved well beyond the Army's capabilities. On February 24 Rokossovskii's chief of operations reported, in part, that the Army had largely completed unloading and was proceeding on two march routes, with the head of the column consisting of the 106th, 162nd, and 175th approaching Kosorzha and the rear passing through Livny. He also reported that each division contained 9,000-11,000 personnel, but up to 75 percent of authorized horses were missing, and there were no tractors at all for the 122mm howitzers in the artillery regiments, so they had to remain where they had been unloaded.

The strategic situation was changing by this time. Already on February 20 the XXXX Panzer Corps of Army Group South had struck the advancing forces of Southwestern Front, scoring immediate gains in the Barvinkove area. A few days later, further overextended mobile formations were destroyed by XXXXVIII Panzer Corps and the SS Panzer Corps. The STAVKA was slow to acknowledge the situation, expecting Rokossovskii's anticipated advance to make the setbacks irrelevant. This began as planned on February 25 as Central Front continued to take advantage of the weaknesses along the boundary of 2nd and 2nd Panzer Armies. The Front was led by 2nd Tank, 13th, and 65th Armies as 70th Army was still two days to the rear. German resistance at Dmitriev-Lgovsky was determined, so the 11th Tank Corps swung southward to bypass the town and drove headlong toward Sevsk, more than 50km to the west.

Rokossovskii's armies had achieved significant success by March 1. 65th Army had pushed a deep salient toward Komarichi and Trosna, and despite the arrival of 78th Infantry Division the next day the Army commander, Lt. Gen. P. I. Batov, remained confident as 70th Army arrived in his support. Dmitriev-Lgovsky had been abandoned, but the garrison began a fighting withdrawal, covering the road to Bryansk, and the rate of advance in the center slowed. The direction also changed from Sevsk–Trubchevsk and more toward Komarichi and Lokat, where German reserves were gathering. During the next five days Central Front made only marginal gains in the center and on the right. On the left much greater (and somewhat misleading) progress was made as 70th Army more fully joined the 65th against the defenses of 76th Infantry and 12th Panzer Divisions on the southern approaches to Oryol; on March 4 the 106th was approaching Liutezh, trailing the rest of the Army. Under Rokossovskii's urgings, the commander of 70th Army, Maj. Gen. G. F. Tarasov, pushed his forces against Trosna without success and at high cost, and it became apparent to all no further advance was possible without additional reinforcements.

=== Oryol Offensive ===
These began arriving in the form of 21st Army from Stalingrad. Determined not to repeat the mistake he made in committing 70th Army piecemeal, Rokossovskii gave it several days to fully assemble around Fatezh before reinforcing Batov and Tarasov. Finally, in the last days of February the STAVKA began to grasp the gravity of the situation created by Army Groups South's counterstroke south of Kharkiv, and began shifting the flow of reserves which had been intended for Central Front. At 2130 hours on March 7 Rokossovskii's mission was changed. Instead of striking deeply at Bryansk and beyond he was to cooperate with Western and Bryansk Fronts in encircling and defeating the German forces in the salient around Oryol:

... 2. Turn the forces of General Batov's, Tarasov's, and Chistiakov's armies from the west toward the north and northeast, with the missions to destroy the enemy's Dmitrovsk-Orlovskii group of forces and cut the railroad line between Briansk and Orel somewhere east of Karachev with the combined forces of these armies and, by doing so, help the Briansk Front liquidate the enemy's Orel group of forces.

The 2nd Tank, 65th and 70th Armies would deploy left to right along the Usozha River with 21st Army joining as soon as possible.

Rokossovskii sent out his orders for the revised plan in the afternoon of March 8, and these expected an early arrival of 21st Army. Tarasov was directed to continue its advance on the morning on March 9 "in the general direction of Volobuevo, Apal'kovo, and Naryshkino" and subsequently capture a series of lines before taking the Oryol region in conjunction with 21st Army around March 14. The 106th had reached the front line west of Chern, on the left flank of 12th Panzer. On the same day the 65th and 2nd Tank Armies made gains, but 2nd Panzer Army began to receive reserves and 70th Army stalled. Meanwhile, the changing situation was producing command confusion within STAVKA; effective March 12 Bryansk Front was disbanded, with three armies shifted to Central Front. The following day a new Reserve Front was established. On March 14 two infantry divisions of 2nd Army began a counterattack east of Hlukhiv against a thin screen on the left flank of Central Front which soon put 2nd Guards Cavalry Corps in an untenable position. Rokossovskii had few options available. An attack by 16th Army north of Oryol had utterly failed, his own progress was minimal, and Army Group South had renewed its offensive against Voronezh Front south of Kharkiv, which had fallen on March 15. As the panzers moved north, Central Front was in jeopardy. 21st Army was reassigned to Voronezh Front, which ended any possibility that Rokossovskii could successfully continue his offensive, although he continued limited operations until March 21.

On April 4 Rokossovskii issued a long decree in which he extensively critiqued the performance of 70th Army and requested that the STAVKA relieve General Tarasov of his command. He focused on fighting in the second half of March for the villages of Svetlyi Luch, Novaia Ialta, Rzhavchik, Muravchik and Hill 260.2 which led to losses of 8,849 personnel killed and wounded, as well as a good deal of equipment. He blamed this, first, on inadequate reconnaissance and poor provision of artillery support. Lack of cooperation with supporting tanks was also noted. No specific criticisms were directed at the 106th. Tarasov was soon removed, being replaced by Lt. Gen. I. V. Galanin. General Donskov was also dismissed on May 13; he would return to the front in January 1944 as commander of the 120th Rifle Corps. He was replaced by Maj. Gen. Fyodor Nikandrovich Smekhotvorov, who had led the 193rd Rifle Division in the defense of the Factory District during the Battle of Stalingrad.

== Battle of Kursk ==
70th Army remained along the line it had gained in March through the rest of the spring and into July. This formed the northwestern corner of the Kursk salient, with 65th Army on its left flank and 13th Army on its right. By late April the STAVKA had decided to go over to the strategic defensive and prepare for a German offensive against the salient, which all intelligence indicated was in the works. The preparation of extensive fortifications was put in hand. The reinforced 70th Army occupied a sector 62km in length. It was not expected to come under attack initially except along its boundary with 13th Army, as the German forces were considered most likely to launch a classic pincer movement against the bases of the salient. However, one variant considered possible by Rokossovskii was a main attack on 70th Army's front in the direction of Fatezh and Kursk.

German plan of attack at Kursk. Note position of 70th Army.

As of July 5, when the offensive began, Galanin had eight rifle divisions under his command, plus three tank regiments, ten artillery and mortar regiments, and an antitank brigade. The 106th had just come under command of the 19th Rifle Corps joining the 162nd and 102nd Divisions, and was in the Army's first echelon, along with the 102nd, 211th, and 280th Rifle Divisions. The tank regiments were grouped behind the right flank where the German attack was most likely. Galanin had placed his headquarters in the woods north of Radogoshcha.

At 0210 hours Rokossovskii ordered an artillery counter-preparation along his Front's right wing. This lasted 20 minutes with mixed results, but delayed the start of the offensive between 1 1/2 and 2 hours. The German artillery preparation began at 0430. The main attack of German 9th Army was directed at Olkhovatka, but a secondary thrust by elements of XXXXVI Panzer Corps' (7th Infantry and 20th Panzer Divisions) was made at the boundary of 13th and 70th Armies at Gnilets. This struck the 132nd and 280th Rifle Divisions but made only marginal gains. However, a group of tanks and motorized infantry managed to penetrate the left flank of 13th Army and got into the rear of the 132nd. Later in the day this division began to fall back under renewed pressure from XXXXVI Corps. However, German losses were very high and the Soviet line remained intact.

Fighting along Central Front's line continued through July 6-7, until Rokossovskii declared to his army commanders that "We have won the defensive battle, and our new mission is to finish off the defeated enemy by the launching of a decisive offensive." The next day, in an effort to revive the offensive, another large German grouping launched heavy attacks against the boundary of 13th and 70th Armies near Samodurovka. More than 200 tanks and self-propelled guns were committed to the attack. The 140th suffered heavy losses and fell back to the south. However, the 175th and neighboring 70th Rifle Division closed off the breach created by the retreat and cut off the tanks and infantry that had infiltrated. These tanks attempted several times to regain contact with their main forces, but gradually fell victim to antitank units. This ended the German offensive along this sector and the former attackers began to dig in.

=== Operation Kutuzov ===
The Western and Bryansk Fronts went over to the offensive against the Oryol salient on July 12. On the same day Rokossovskii ordered his Front to be ready to go over to the attack on July 15. Apart from the 13th, his armies had emerged relatively unscathed from the defensive battle. 70th Army, with the 19th Tank Corps, was to hold a line from Katomki to Shepelevo to Verkhnyaya Grankina to Chern using three divisions while the remaining forces were to attack from Teploe to Muravl. They were first to destroy the forces of 9th Army that had penetrated the Front's positions and regain the original line by the end of July 17. Following this, they were to continue to advance in the general direction of Oryol. In the first phase the 70th was to specifically cooperate with 13th and 48th Armies, as well as 16th Air Army.

On the first day, in common with most of the Front, Galinin's forces only made slight gains. The following morning, units on his right wing defeated the German grouping in the area of Height 250 and reached the area of Gnilets. German resistance was stubborn, based on covering detachments of infantry and tanks (some disabled from the earlier fighting) as the main forces fell back to their July 5 jumping-off positions. These had been well prepared over months and the German command expected to halt the offensive here. At about this time the 106th was reassigned to the 29th Rifle Corps.

The commander of 9th Army, Gen. W. Model, demanded that his troops maintain these positions, but Central Front's right wing armies maintained their momentum and on July 21 broke through the line along the Ochka River before pushing onward toward Kamenets and Kromy. During the following 10 days the 13th and 70th Armies made a steady advance despite desperate counterattacks. By the end of August 1 they had reached a line from Nadezhda to Krasnikovo while continuing the march on Kromy. General Smekhotvorov was severely wounded and hospitalized the same day. He would never hold another field command and spent most of his remaining career in the educational establishment until his retirement in 1954. He was replaced by his deputy commander, Col. Mikhail Markovich Vlasov.

On August 4, elements of Bryansk Front's 3rd Army liberated Oryol. The right wing armies of Central Front took Kromy on August 6 and by the end of August 11 had reached a line from Mytskoe to outside Dmitrovsk-Orlovskii. This town was taken the next day, and by August 17-18 a line from Glybochka to Terekhovka to Uporoi had been reached. This line contained previously prepared positions in some depth (the Hagen Line), and during the following days the advance slowed considerably.

== Into Ukraine and Belarus ==
Late in August 70th Army was moved to the Reserve of the Supreme High Command and the 106th shifted to 65th Army's 18th Rifle Corps, still in Central Front. This Army was under command of Lt. Gen. P. I. Batov. The Front struck 2nd Army's center at Sevsk and east flank at Klintsy on August 26. The Front's forces quickly broke the German line with 60th Army in the lead. On September 2 the XIII Army Corps was ordered to fall back to the west and maintain contact with Army Group South, but instead was pushed south across the Seym River into the 4th Panzer Army sector, thereby opening a 30km wide gap between Army Groups South and Center. The following day, 2nd Army withdrew to the Desna River as General Rokossovskii paused to regroup. On September 9 the Front's forces forced this river south of Novhorod-Siverskyi and at Otsekin.

=== Gomel-Rechytsa Offensive ===
On October 1 the division was under direct Army command. Most of 65th Army was facing the XX Army Corps of 2nd Army. Over the next two days the 65th, and 61st Army to the south, reached the Sozh River on a sector some 70km wide from south of Gomel to west of Dubrovka. 65th Army's specific frontage was from the mouth of the Iput River to Loyew. The 354th Rifle Division had taken a small bridgehead over the Sozh from the 6th Infantry Division on September 29 which Batov proceeded to reinforce. While the depth of the bridgehead was expanded to 4km over the following days, German reinforcements brought 19th Corps to a halt. By October 20, 65th Army's attacks had bogged down on this sector, and the offensive towards Gomel was temporarily halted. Central Front was now redesignated as Belorussian Front.

While the battle for the Sozh had been going on Rokossovskii carried out a major regrouping of his forces during October 8-14 which, among other moves, took the 106th, now in 27th Rifle Corps with the 193rd Division and the 115th Rifle Brigade, south to a sector on the Dniepr between Loyew and Radul. Despite the scale of the redeployment it went mostly undetected by German intelligence. 27th Corps was slated to attack from Suslovka to Lake Sviatoe following an artillery and smoke preparation. At 0630 hours on October 15 Colonel Vlasov led his forces, consisting of three advanced battalions of 250-600 men each, in a crossing south of Loyew which proved successful. The bridgehead was expanded over the following days and on October 17 the division stormed the German strongpoint at Loyew. In recognition of this success, Vlasov and 37 of his men were made Heroes of the Soviet Union on October 30. In addition, the division as a whole was given the honorific "Dniepr" on November 17. By October 20 the bridgehead held by 27th and 18th Corps, which had crossed from Lake Sviatoe to Radul, was 18km wide and up to 13km deep. While this was not large enough to permit the commitment of the 2nd Guards Cavalry Corps, and the 1st Guards Tank Corps had not yet completed its redeployment, the German command realized it had no choice but to pull its remaining forces along the lower Sozh back to the west bank of the Dniepr. This took place overnight on October 17/18, with 19th Corps in close pursuit.

On October 20 Rokossovskii ordered his 65th and 61st Armies to regroup for a new drive two days later to take Rechytsa, Kalinkavichy, and Mazyr. Batov would make the main attack toward Rechytsa. 27th Corps now contained the 106th, 354th, and 246th Rifle Divisions plus the 115th Brigade. It and the 18th Corps would attack from the Loyew bridgehead with the 2nd Guards Cavalry as a mobile force, along with 9th Tank Corps, 7th Guards Cavalry Corps, and 4th Artillery Penetration Corps. 9th Tanks had some 50 tanks on strength. The attack against three extremely worn-down divisions of the German XX Corps began before the regrouping was complete. On October 24, the divisions of 27th Corps punched a 5km-wide breach in the positions of 102nd Infantry Division south of Lipniaki, into which Batov committed the 2nd Guards Cavalry. Only an intervention by a battle group of 2nd Panzer Division contained it. Heavy fighting raged for more than a week until 2nd Army was forced to begin a phased withdrawal to new positions in the rear. By October 28, 27th Corps had advanced another 15–20km, as much as 23km northwest of Loyew, linking up with the advancing forces of 61st Army, but the forces of both armies had by now "shot their bolt", and a halt was called on October 30.

Over the next ten days Belorussian Front carried out another regrouping to continue the offensive and encircle and destroy the German Rechitsa-Gomel grouping. 65th Army remained in the center of the Front's main attack sector, with 27th Corps on its right wing. The 106th was in the second echelon, along with the 246th. The Corps' mission was:

... to penetrate the enemy defense in the Bushatin region (a sector of 4 kilometres), destroy the opposing enemy in their strongholds, and capture Hill 131.6 and the village of Prokisel (at a depth of 6 kilometers).

The order went on to set further objectives. The offensive reopened on November 10, and in the first two days the 27th and 19th Corps had carved out a penetration which was then exploited into the Germans' operational rear by 1st Guards Tank and 7th Guards Cavalry Corps. On November 13, 27th Corps, with the assistance of elements of the tank Corps, captured Demekhi, 12km west of Rechitsa, cutting the German rail line to that city from the west. The Corps then led a wheeling movement to the northwest, attempting to reach the Berezina River south of Parychy. By nightfall on November 20 the 27th was approaching Vasilkov, 25km northwest of Rechytsa, and on the same day the Germans faced reality and withdrew from the city, which was liberated by elements of 42nd Rifle Corps. By this point, the offensive had unhinged all of Army Group Center's defenses in southern Belorussia, and Soviet forces were exploiting into a 20km-wide gap.

=== Kalinkavichy Offensive ===
Meanwhile, farther north, the 18th and 95th Rifle Corps prepared to turn the flank of 2nd Army north of Kalinkavichy. 18th Corps, now reinforced by the 106th, made a march of 50km to relieve elements of 7th Guards Cavalry near Novinki and Vasilevichy. The two rifle Corps attacked at dawn on November 23 on a broad front west, east, and south of Novinki. This push ran into the 5th Panzer Division which managed to restore some stability to the German line north and northeast of Kalinkavichy, which finally gelled by the end of the month. Between November 23-30 another regrouping took place, in which the 106th, 140th, and 162nd were moved north to join 18th Rifle Corps north of Kalinkavichy, while 19th and 27th Corps were reinforced with other units to continue the northward advance. This would lead to considerable back-and-forth fighting in the vicinity of Shatsilki. The 106th, along with the 354th and 115th Brigade, made an unopposed march to establish contact with local partisan brigades through what became known as the Rudobelskie Gates, a route for arms, ammunition, and personnel over the following weeks.

27th and 19th Corps defended each side of the "gates" while also attempting to expand the breach through Parychy to Babruysk. However, both Corps were badly overextended. 27th Corps, now with the 106th, 60th, and 354th Divisions, faced the 4th Panzer Division at Azarychy on 2nd Army's still-open left flank, while its reconnaissance battalion operated against the partisans. In the first week of December Batov was ordered to conduct yet another regrouping, after which the Corps was to attack 4th Panzer by way of Koreny. This began on December 8, but the 106th and 60th went to ground almost immediately. The 354th took Koreny and advanced 4km to split 4th Panzer from 5th Panzer. The next day 4th Panzer held firm at Azarychy, and by December 12 the offensive had ground to a halt.

==== Operation Nikolaus and move south ====
Before Rokossovskii and Batov could renew their offensive Army Group Center moved to restore contact between its 2nd and 9th Armies. On December 15 the XXXXI Panzer Corps of 9th Army was assigned to defend the Parychy–Babruysk sector. It received the rebuilt 16th Panzer Division, which was currently the strongest panzer force on the Soviet-German front with 113 tanks and 251 armored halftracks. 2nd Army gathered a battle group based on the 12th Panzer Division in the rear of 4th Panzer; between them the two divisions had roughly 85 tanks available. The two forces were ready to attack on the night of December 19/20.

West of the gap the 106th and 60th Divisions, along with the partisan brigades, continued to screen the long front from the partisan-held areas to 4th Panzer's defenses north of Azarychy, and were in no position to resist a panzer attack in strength. After a reconnaissance in strength during December 19 that attack came early on December 20. Following a 45-minute artillery preparation the 16th Panzer smashed the entire defense of 19th Corps' 37th and 38th Guards Rifle Divisions, driving them back some 5km. At the same time, 4th Panzer struck northward from Azarychy, breaking the defenses of the 106th and 60th while its reconnaissance battalion pushed the partisans aside and moved to link up with a regiment of 134th Infantry Division late the next day. The two Guards divisions, the 60th, and the 115th Brigade were soon caught in encirclement and were fighting for survival. Batov did what he could to support his embattled forces, and 48th Army sent two divisions to help. The German shock groups continued their attacks on December 22-23 in an effort to destroy the surrounded grouping. The 134th Infantry and 4th Panzer pushed eastward toward Davydovka, driving the disrupted 106th and 60th in front of them. During the next three days the German force tried to finish off the pocket, but many individuals and small groups managed to evade southward through the thick terrain to reinforce the new Soviet defense line from Davydovka to just north of the railroad to Shatsilki. By December 27 the remnants of the 106th and 60th occupied the western end of this line. By this time, with the gap between the Armies closed and the 16th Panzer needed elsewhere, Operation Nikolaus came to a close.

Rokossovskii had been on notice since December 9 that he would have to transfer six rifle divisions to 1st Ukrainian Front. Following the retaking of Kyiv in November that Front had come under increasing pressure from Army Group South. The first three divisions were dispatched on December 15; the 106th was one of the remaining three and did not arrive until February 16, where it came under command of 13th Army before being assigned to that Army's 76th Rifle Corps in March. The division would remain in this Front for the duration of the war. On February 9 the 362nd Artillery Regiment had been awarded the Order of the Red Banner for its contributions to the December campaigns.

== Into Western Ukraine ==
In early January the right flank of this Front, led by 13th and 60th Armies, renewed its advance west of Kyiv, with the former moving in the direction of Rivne. This city could be used as a base for further operations toward Lublin and Lviv. Rivne was taken on February 2 and as the 106th began to arrive the left flank of Army Group South was falling apart, but the situation was stabilized by March 2.

=== Kamenets–Podolsky Pocket ===
On March 5 the 13th Army attacked west between Lutsk and Dubno, and 1st Panzer Army was forced back to the south away from Shepetivka. By the next day a gap some 140km wide had been driven between 1st and 4th Panzer Armies, but the Soviet advance began to slow, in part due to lack of fuel. Despite this, the 13th cleared both Lutsk and Dubno on March 16. The previous day the 27th Corps, with the 1st and 6th Guards Cavalry Corps and 25th Tank Corps, struck toward Brody. This city had been declared a "fortress" by Hitler on March 8, and although it was outflanked to the north the garrison was able to hold out as Soviet objectives were deflected to the south. On April 16 the 106th was transferred with 76th Corps to 3rd Guards Army, which was under command of Col. Gen. V. N. Gordov. The division would remain in 3rd Guards into peacetime.

=== Lvov–Sandomierz Offensive ===
In preparation for the summer offensive into Poland the 3rd Guards Army was positioned on the right (north) flank of 1st Ukrainian Front, and 76th Corps was located on the right flank of the Army's shock group, with the 106th in first echelon, the 149th in second, and the 181st Rifle Division in third. By July 10 the Front command had received information about possible German withdrawals from several vulnerable sectors prior to the main offensive. In response all first echelon divisions were to form reconnaissance detachments of reinforced rifle companies to begin combat operations at 2200 hours on July 12, continuing until 0100 hours on the 13th. The reconnaissance confirmed that the main German forces facing 3rd Guards and the right flank of 13th Army were pulling back under cover of rearguards. At 0300 the Army's forward battalions went over to the attack, and moved forward to the next prepared defensive line. The assault continued at 0515 hours on July 14 following a 30-minute artillery preparation and faced counterattacks from the 16th and 17th Panzer Divisions. The next day at 0800 hours the Army began to penetrate the second German defensive belt; during the day the 76th Corps advanced as much as 8km in pursuit supported by armor and air attacks. This line, anchored on the Luha River, was eventually forced and by the end of July 31 the Corps reached the Vistula and had taken a small bridgehead near Annopol. On August 9 the 106th would receive the Order of the Red Banner for its success in penetrating the German defenses in the Lviv direction.

During August 30-31 the bridgehead, which had been considerably enlarged over the previous weeks, came under attack by German infantry supported by up to 30 tanks. The 106th's defenses were split into three sections and penetrated to a depth of as much as 5km. The division lost 153 men killed, 184 wounded, and 392 missing in action, many of these also killed or taken prisoner. In addition, 34 artillery pieces, 19 mortars, and 70 machine guns were destroyed or captured. The blame "for a loss of vigilance and major miscalculations in organizing the defense" fell squarely on Colonel Vlasov, who was put on trial on September 1 after being relieved of his command. The verdict of the Front's military tribunal was 10 years in a labor camp "for criminal negligence", although this was suspended for the duration of the war. In October his was placed in command of the 183rd Rifle Division's 295th Rifle Regiment and his service was sufficiently distinguished that his conviction was expunged in February 1945 and he was awarded the Order of Kutuzov. Vlasov ended the war in command of the 140th Division. Maj. Gen. Zakhar Trofimovich Trofimov had taken command of the 106th on September 2.

== Into Poland and Germany ==
By the start of September the division had been reassigned to the 120th Rifle Corps. During that month the composition of the Corps changed to just the 106th and 149th Divisions. During November they were joined by the 197th Rifle Division, and it was still in this composition at the start of January 1945. General Trofimov had left the division on December 17 and was replaced by Col. Grigorii Matveevich Kochenov.

When the winter offensive began on January 12 the Corps was in the Army's first echelon. During January 25 the 76th Corps led the battles that captured Ostrów Wielkopolski and Els, but the contributions of the 362nd Artillery Regiment and the 63rd Antitank Battalion were sufficient for the former to be awarded the Order of Suvorov, 3rd Degree, and the latter the Order of Bogdan Khmelnitsky, 3rd Degree, on February 19. The Corps remained in the vanguard as the Army began approaching the Oder River on January 28; this river and the Silesian industrial area were the immediate objectives of the Front. By the end of January, the 3rd Guards Army had all three of its Corps deployed in a single echelon and was attacking along a sector 70km wide. The 21st and 120th Corps were overcoming the resistance of German 9th Army, which was falling back to the southwest under pressure of the 1st Belorussian Front. 120th Corps was now committed to encircle a German grouping in the area of Leszno in cooperation with 21st Rifle Corps. In the course of three days this grouping of 15,000 troops was defeated, with many forced to surrender. By this time most of the rifle divisions involved in the offensive averaged about 5,500 personnel each.

=== Lower Silesian Offensive ===
On January 31 the Front commander, Marshal I. S. Konev, ordered Gordov to continue an energetic offensive with 120th Corps and the 25th Tank Corps, and by the end of February 2 to reach the Oder along the sector Odereck–Glogau, where it was to establish tactical cooperation with units of 1st Belorussian Front. By that date the Corps reached the river along the Kleinitz–Lippen sector, but was unable to force a crossing. At this point, 3rd Guards Army was stretched across a frontage of 104km. By February 8 the 120th Corps had been deployed to cover 96km of this, along with the 127th Rifle Division of 21st Corps, while the remainder of that Corps and the 76th Corps were concentrated to conducted the next main attack.

During the first days of this assault the German 72nd Infantry Division continued to try to hold a bridgehead on the right bank of the Gross Land Canal, but during February 9-10 the 120th Corps crushed this resistance and reached the Oder along a front from Aufhalt to Rabsen. At the same time, the German forces continued to put up fierce resistance in an effort to hold the fortress area of Glogau and Breslau, often counterattacking and bringing up additional forces. While 120th Corps advanced north of Glogau, the remainder of 3rd Guards Army's shock force continued to roll up the German defense along the Oder, bypassing the Glogau area from the south. However, Konev continued to urge Gordov to speed up the defeat of the Glogau grouping and vigorously advance toward the Bóbr River. The next day Gordov began carrying out this assignment, and the fiercest fighting unfolded in the Glogau area. Despite desperate German efforts the 3rd Guards Army persistently threw them out of one inhabited locale after another and by the end of the day units of 21st Corps had outflanked the city from the north, east and south. A retreat route remained open, but was already threatened with being cut by the Army's left flank formations. It was clear that the garrison at Glogau was not preparing to abandon the place and was trying to distract to itself as many Soviet troops as possible.

Insofar as Glogau was heavily fortified the battle for its capture might have stretched out for a long time and tied down significant forces. Thus the decision was made to encircle it and leave behind the 329th Rifle Division to blockade the fortress while the remaining forces of the Army's shock group continued the offensive. 21st Corps, with the 25th Tanks, completed cutting off the Glogau garrison before continuing to advance westward to roll up the defense along the Oder beginning on February 12, while 120th Corps was pulled back to the Army's second echelon.

Following the defeat and encirclement of XXIV Panzer Corps in the Glogau area the pace of 3rd Guards Army's advance began to increase rapidly because the Panzer Corps' remnants began falling back hurriedly, putting up little resistance. By February 15 the entire bend of the Oder had been cleared of German forces, and 3rd Guards, having captured the towns of Grossen and Naumburg, had reached the Bóbr from its mouth to Naumburg. The arrival of the Army at the Bóbr significantly improved the situation along the right flank of the Front's main shock group. The width of the Army's attack front shrank from 104km to 36km.

By February 16 the line of the Bóbr and Kweis rivers was being defended by three corps of 4th Panzer Army. XXXX Panzer Corps faced the 3rd Guards Army. According to Konev's plan for the next phase of the offensive the Front's main group of forces, including 3rd Guards, was to reach the Neisse River, capture bridgeheads on the west bank, and securely consolidate along the line reached. On orders from Konev, Gordov launched his following attack along his Army's right wing to make use of the Grossen–Guben paved road. By the end of the day the 120th Corps had been brought up to the 21st Corps attack sector, followed by the 25th Tanks. On the morning of the 17th the tankers, in cooperation with units of 21st Corps, crushed the resistance of the "Matterstock" Special Designation Division and advanced 12km toward Guben. In a successful drive the 120th Corps reached a line from Polo to Kanig to Grocho by day's end on February 19, and part of its forces were in Zaude, fighting in its east outskirts. Overnight, remnants of the 2.SS-Sturmbrigade Dirlewanger and 16th Panzer, retreating toward Guben, ran into the Polo–Kanig line and began a fight that continued through the next day. This did not prevent the Corps from completing the capture of the strongpoint of Lindenheim and entering the wooded area northeast of Guben. Altogether as a result of the fighting during February 15–20 the 3rd Guards Army had crushed German resistance along the Bóbr and reached the Neisse with its right flank along a 10km sector.

The next day the Army's 76th Corps, plus the main forces of 13th Army also reached the Neisse in the sector controlled by 4th Tank Army. Although there were efforts to take bridgeheads on the west bank these were ultimately unsuccessful and the Front's forces consolidated on the east bank. By the beginning of March 120th Corps had only the 106th and 127th Divisions under command. Colonel Kochenov left the division on March 9 and was replaced for a week by Col. Leonid Ivanovich Mikheev until Col. Andronik Sarkisovich Sarkisyan took over on March 17. This officer had held a number of divisional commands without distinction and had most recently been leading the 236th Rifle Regiment. He was wounded and evacuated on April 14, and was replaced for the duration by Maj. Gen. Emilyan Ivanovich Vasilenko. While commanding the 136th Rifle Division in February 1942 it was redesignated as the 15th Guards Rifle Division and he led it through the Battle of Stalingrad. He had most recently attended the Voroshilov Academy before taking command of the 253rd Rifle Division.

== Berlin Offensive ==
At the start of the Berlin offensive the 3rd Guards Army was still deployed on the east bank of the Neisse along a 28km front from Groß Gastrose to Klein Bademüsel. The 106th had returned to 76th Corps, which also contained the 287th and 389th Rifle Divisions. The Corps was on the Army's right flank, which was not the axis of the main attack. This would be launched along the Army's left wing, forcing the river on a 9km sector from outside Forst to outside Klein Bademüsel. The 76th Corps had the 106th and 287th in first echelon while the 389th served as the Army's reserve. The Army's second echelon consisted of 25th Tank Corps.

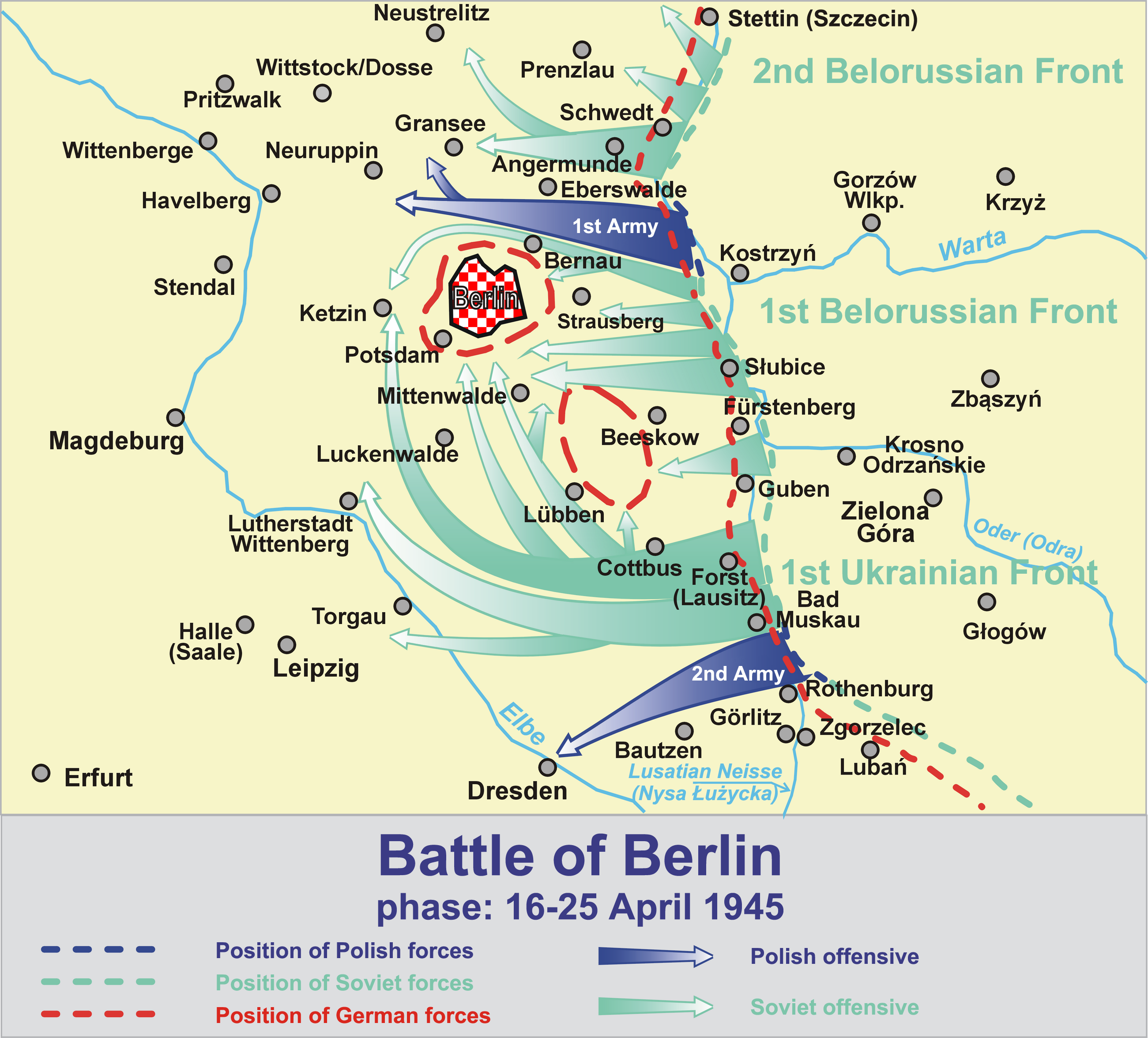
Battle of Berlin. Note locations of Forst and Cottbus and eventual encirclement of German 9th Army.

The offensive began on April 16. 120th Corps, operating with 25th Tanks, broke through the German main defense zone. By the end of the day the Corps had reached a line from the south part of Forst to Damsdorf, having advanced 4-5km. The 106th, on the left flank of 76th Corps, seized the southern and eastern portions of Forst. The success of the attack was aided to a significant degree by the Front's aviation, which destroyed Koine, a German strongpoint in the main defensive zone, and forced the garrison of Forst to go to ground. The 6th Guards Tank Corps of 3rd Guards Tank Army began crossing the Neisse at 1400 hours, completing this by 1900, and by the end of the day its forward brigades were fighting alongside 120th and 21st Corps for Damsdorf.

The next day 3rd Guards Army, still with 6th Guards Tanks in support, resumed the attack at 0900 hours, encountering heavy resistance as it advanced on Cottbus. The 106th was joined by the 287th in the continuing battle for Forst. The 197th was moved up from second echelon, and 120th Corps, still working with 25th Tanks, captured the Adlig-Dubrau strongpoint and, having advanced 5-7km, by the end of the day was fighting along a line from the southern outskirts of Forst to the southern outskirts of Eilo to the southern outskirts of Gosda to Adlig-Dubrau. On April 18 the 106th exchanged assignments with the 149th Division from 120th Corps and joined that Corps in advancing 3-5km. By dusk the Corps was fighting for Weissach and the southern part of Tranitz.

During April 19 the 3rd Guards Army encountered stubborn resistance from the Germans' Cottbus group of forces. The city was one of the most important resistance centers in the third defense zone. During the day 76th Corps completed the breakthrough of the second defensive zone, codenamed "Matilda", during the course of an advance of 9km, and by day's end had reached the line Tranitz–Sadersdorf, in the intermediate zone facing northwest between the second and third. 21st Corps was reinforced with the 106th and the reserve 389th and by day's end had reached a line from outside Frauendorf to outside Hallingen. It now turned its front to the north and forced a crossing of the Spree River before attacking toward Cottbus from the south along the river's west bank. The next day the Army continued to fight along the intermediate position on a line from outside Gross Lieskow to Schliechow to Karen, having advanced 1-2km, but running into heavy fire 76th Corps made no advance at all. With the support of an advance by 21st Corps the 3rd Guards Tank Army managed to cut the German grouping's retreat route to the west and pinned it to the Spree's swampy flood plain.

Over the next two days of stubborn fighting the 3rd Guards Army took Cottbus by storm and eliminated the Cottbus grouping, routing the 342nd, 214th and 275th Infantry Divisions plus a number of other elements and units. 1,500 prisoners were taken, plus 100 tanks, 2,000 motor vehicles, 60 guns, and several depots of military equipment. With the elimination of the Cottbus grouping the Army had enveloped the German Frankfurt–Guben grouping, which was based on the 9th Army, from the south and southwest. Even after this fighting ended the 76th Corps remained engaged along a line from Sadersdorf to Heinersbruck to Mertzdorf.

=== Encirclement battle with 9th Army ===
During April 23 the 3rd Guards Army, in order to prevent a breakout by 9th Army, and to securely close the Lübbenau–Oderin sector, by the end of the day was moving its main forces to its left flank. 76th Corps made only a minor advance with its left flank and was fighting on a line from Sadersdorf to Heinersbruck to Zillow. 25th Tanks was concentrated in its rear to reinforce the Beeskow–Lübben axis. The encircled German grouping contained about 200,000 men, more than 2,000 guns and mortars, and more than 200 tanks and assault guns. As the result of the lateral regrouping the 3rd Guards had firmly closed all avenues to a German retreat to the south and southwest, having created a solid front of rifle units.

The commander of the encircled grouping, Gen. der Inf. T. Busse, received orders from Hitler on April 25 to break through the encirclement ring and attack in the direction of Halbe in an effort to link up with 12th Army, which was operating southwest of Berlin. On the morning of April 26 the 76th Corps was still fighting to reduce the pocket in an area from outside the Bilenersee to Muhlendorf. Gordov was ordered to maintain one division in reserve in Teupitz; to block all the forest roads running from east to west; to create strongpoints along the Cottbus–Berlin road; and take several other measures to prevent a breakout. 76th Corps would continue to attack toward Straupitz and Schlepzig. After an overnight regrouping the German command had created a powerful breakthrough grouping led by 50 tanks to strike the boundary between 3rd Guards and 28th Armies. By 1000 hours it had created a gap between 329th and 58th Divisions in the Halbe area and had cut the Baruth–Zossen highway, which was the main communications artery for both Soviet armies. The 389th, along with the 25th Tanks, counterattacked the breakthrough group from the Stackow area and isolated it from the remainder of the 9th Army. As a result of fighting during the remainder of the day and overnight a significant part of the breakthrough group was destroyed in the woods northeast of Baruth. At about this time the 106th returned to 120th Corps.

Following the elimination of the breakthrough group the encircled German forces were occupying no more than 900km^{2}. On April 27, Gordov was ordered to preempt the formation of another breakthrough group by attacking with his first echelon divisions from the south and west in the general direction of Münchehofe. The 149th and 253rd Divisions were to take up defensive positions along the line from Terpt and further north along the highway as far as Neuendorf. Despite these efforts the 9th Army made a further effort to break through the encirclement ring in the direction of Halbe. During the day numerous efforts were made by groups of up to 1,000 men, supported by armor, but none were successful. 1st Belorussian Front's 3rd Army linked up with units of 21st Corps in the Lopten–Halbe area.

As a result of the April 27 fighting the German group of forces in the woods north of Baruth was eliminated, as were all their attempts to again organize a breakthrough to the west. By now the pocket had shrunk to about 400km^{2}. During the next day forces of both Fronts continued squeezing the ring. In the morning the 9th Army made another effort to escape through the Halbe area with a group up to an infantry division in strength, supported by up to 18-20 tanks. This struck the sector Teirow–Lopten occupied by 21st Corps and 40th Rifle Corps of 3rd Army. By the end of the day, having beaten off 12 German attacks, the units of both Corps continued to hold their previous positions, taking prisoners and seizing equipment. Meanwhile, the 120th Corps attacked along the western bank of the Spree but made only marginal gains, reaching the southern outskirts of Wendish-Buchholz. By the end of the day the pocket was about 10km north-to-south and up to 14km east-to-west.

The German command faced the prospect of complete defeat of 9th Army and so overnight undertook a new and decisive attempt to break out with the bulk of its remaining forces in an effort to link up with another break-in attempt by 12th Army. The attack began at 0100 hours on April 29, led by up to 10,000 infantry, supported by 35-40 tanks, at the Teirow–Halbe boundary. At dawn, following heavy fighting, the German grouping managed to break through the 21st and 40th Corps, reach the Staatsforst Stachow woods and cut the highway 3km southeast of Tornow. The breakout was temporarily halted by units of 28th Army's 3rd Guards Rifle Corps but the German grouping was now reinforced to a strength of up to 45,000 troops and created a 2km-wide breach between 50th Guards and 54th Guards Rifle Divisions in the Münchendorf area. Taking advantage of this breach, despite powerful artillery and mortar fire from north and south, German forces began to break out, first in small groups and then in entire columns, to the Staatsforst Kummersdorf woods. By the end of the day the breakout had again been halted by reinforcements from 3rd Guards and 4th Guards Tank Armies and the 117th Guards Rifle Division. At the same time the 120th and 76th Corps were attacking toward 21st Corps in an effort to re-close the gap in the Teirow sector. As a result of these and other counterattacks the greater part of 9th Army was again encircled. It was still 30km from 12th Army.

Overnight, the Army commanders of 1st Ukrainian Front undertook a number of measures directed at preventing any further German advance to the west and finally eliminating the pocketed forces. Gordov directed his Corps operating in the Tornow–Freidorf area to destroy the German units by attacks from the east. Meanwhile, the German grouping continued to make desperate efforts to escape, gaining another 10km to the west. By the end of the day 3rd Guards Army, fighting through the Staatsforst Stachow woods, destroyed the tail end of the grouping. At this point its remnants had been split into separate groups which were out of contact with each other, and mass surrenders began; 1st Ukrainian Front alone took 24,000 prisoners. The last resistance ended on May 1.

== Postwar ==
When the shooting stopped the division was advancing on Prague with most of its Front's forces. In final honors on June 4, the 43rd and 236th Rifle Regiments were awarded the Order of Kutuzov, 3rd Degree, the 188th Rifle and the 362nd Artillery Regiments each received the Order of Bogdan Khmelnitsky, 2nd Degree, and the 63rd Antitank Battalion was given the Order of Alexander Nevsky, all for their roles in the fighting for Dresden. On the same date the division as a whole was decorated with the Order of Suvorov, in the 2nd Degree, for its part in the liquidation of German 9th Army. General Vasilenko went on to command the 166th Rifle and 53rd Guards Rifle Divisions postwar before his retirement in January 1955.

Shortly after the peace the 106th began loading on trains and heading east to the Transcaucasian Military District. Once there its personnel and equipment, along with that of the 94th Rifle Brigade, were used to form the 407th Rifle Division, the first postwar rifle division formed by the Red Army.
