= 335th Rifle Division =

335th Rifle Division (September 9, 1941 – November 28, 1942) 335th Rifle Division (May 25, 1944 - 1945)
- Active: 1941–1945
- Country: Soviet Union
- Branch: Red Army
- Type: Infantry
- Size: Division
- Engagements: Barvenkovo–Lozovaya Offensive Operation; Second Battle of Kharkov; Case Blue; Battle of the Caucasus; Soviet invasion of Manchuria

Commanders
- Notable commanders: Col. Ivan Grigorevich Fofanov; Lt. Col. Pavel Mikhailovich Volosatykh; Col. Ivan Afanasevich Shevchenko; Col. Ivan Ivanovich Malinovskii

The 335th Rifle Division was first formed in September 1941, as a standard Red Army rifle division, at Stalingrad. It was a "sister" unit to the 341st Rifle Division, which was formed at about the same time and place and shared a very similar combat path in its first formation. The division was assigned to the southern sector of the Soviet-German front during the winter counteroffensive, but took severe losses during the German spring offensive that formed the Izium Pocket, and it was all but destroyed in the opening phase of Case Blue. The division was formed again nearly two years later, this time in the Far Eastern Front, and spent the rest of the war mainly on coastal defense duties. The 335th had one of the shortest and least distinguished careers of any Soviet rifle division.

== 1st Formation ==
The division first formed on September 9, 1941 in the North Caucasus Military District at Stalingrad. Its basic order of battle was as follows:

- 1121st Rifle Regiment
- 1123rd Rifle Regiment
- 1125th Rifle Regiment
- 898th Artillery Regiment

Its first commander, Col. Ivan Grigorevich Fofanov, was appointed the day the division began forming. The division's personnel contained a significant number of non-Russian nationality. In October, while still barely formed, the division was assigned to 57th Army, which was also just in the process of forming-up in the Reserve of the Supreme High Command. In December the division and its Army moved to join Southwestern Front, taking part in the Barvenkovo–Lozovaya Offensive which led to the creation of the Izium salient south of Kharkov. On December 10, Colonel Fofanov was succeeded by Lt. Col. Pavel Mikhailovich Volosatykh. On February 9, 1942, this officer was relieved of his command and replaced by Col. Ivan Afanasevich Shevchenko, who would remain in command for the rest of the first formation. Ten days later, Volosatykh was condemned to eight years front-line duty and was moved to command of 674th Rifle Regiment of the 150th Rifle Division; despite this disgrace he would eventually be promoted to major general and would become a Hero of the Soviet Union. In April, the 335th was transferred to 9th Army in Southern Front, on the southern flank of the salient.

=== Second Battle of Kharkov ===
On May 17, 9th Army came under attack from the German III Motorized and XXXXIV Army Corps. The 335th was holding a sector to the southeast of Barvenkovo, with a strength of between 5,000 and 6,000 men. The German offensive did not target the division directly, but smashed in the front lines on both flanks, so by day's end on the 17th the division was partly encircled, along with 106th and 349th Rifle Divisions. The next day the beleaguered divisions were able to link up with the remaining units of 5th Cavalry Corps, but a change in direction of the enemy advance cut them off from the crossings to the left bank of the northern Donets River, where 9th Army was trying to reorganize. On May 19,

"Without centralized control, this group of forces broke out of encirclement on their own initiative. At dawn... it arrived at the region of Zavodskaia and, with heavy losses, crossed to the left bank of the river."

By May 22, the remnants of the 335th was holding the line along the Donets west of Izium; despite its losses, it avoided the fate of the 6th and 57th Armies which were pocketed the same day.

=== Operation Blue ===
When 1st Panzer and 17th Army launched the German summer offensive on their sectors on July 7, the 335th was still in Southern Front, but now in 24th Army. This newly-formed army, with just four damaged rifle divisions, was attempting to provide a second echelon for the Front. On July 10 the Front was ordered to form those divisions into a task force along with a special tank group to move northeastward to block the XXXX Panzer Corps in the Chertkovo area. This move availed very little, and led to a good many men of the 335th being killed or captured in the Millerovo pocket. By August 1 the division was officially in 24th Army in North Caucasus Front listed as "without troops". As there weren't enough resources in the Caucasus to rebuild the division from just a headquarters, it was officially disbanded on November 28.

== 2nd Formation ==
After being absent for nearly two years from the Red Army order of battle, a new 335th Rifle Division was formed on May 25, 1944, in the Far Eastern Front, based on the 6th Rifle Brigade. Col. Ivan Ivanovich Malinovskii was appointed to command on the same day, which he would hold for the duration. This division was assigned to the 88th Rifle Corps, a separate corps stationed on the Pacific coast near Vladivostok. During the Soviet invasion of Manchuria in August, 1945, the 335th was in 1st Far Eastern Front as part of the Chuguevsk Operational Group, a covering force which saw little major combat or offensive action.

== Postwar ==
The 335th ended the war without any battle honors or unit decorations. It was disbanded later in 1945 in the Primorsky Military District.
