= 349th Rifle Division =

349th Rifle Division (September 9, 1941 – 1946)
- Active: 1941–1946
- Country: Soviet Union
- Branch: Red Army
- Type: Division
- Role: Infantry
- Engagements: Barvenkovo–Lozovaya Offensive Operation; Second Battle of Kharkov; Battle of the Caucasus

Commanders
- Notable commanders: Col. Filipp Vasilevich Brailyan; Col. Aleksandr Ilich Shchagin; Maj. Gen. Isidor Andreevich Silagadze

The 349th Rifle Division formed in September, 1941, as a standard Red Army rifle division, at Astrakhan. It was assigned to the southern sector of the Soviet-German front, and first saw action in January, 1942, during the winter counteroffensive, but was badly damaged during the German spring offensive that formed the Izium Pocket. The remaining men and equipment of the unit managed to retreat into the Caucasus region in the face of the German summer offensive in such a weakened state that German intelligence wrote the division off as destroyed in October. In fact, the cadre of the division survived, and was transferred to the reserves of Transcaucasus Front in that same month, where it slowly replenished as a low-priority unit. By the end of the year the 349th was assigned to 45th Army along the border with Turkey, and it remained on this quiet front for the duration of the war.

== Formation ==
The division began forming on September 9, 1941, in the North Caucasus Military District at Astrakhan. Its basic order of battle was as follows:

- 1169th Rifle Regiment
- 1171st Rifle Regiment
- 1173rd Rifle Regiment
- 906th Artillery Regiment

Col. Filipp Vasilevich Brailyan was assigned to command of the division on the day it began forming, and he continued in command until May 9, 1942. The division's personnel contained a significant number of non-Russian nationality. In October, while still barely formed, the division was assigned to 57th Army, which was also just in the process of forming-up in the Reserve of the Supreme High Command, near Stalingrad. After two more months in the reserves the division and its Army moved to join Southern Front, taking part in the winter counter-offensive which led to the creation of the Izium salient south of Kharkov. In April, 1942, the 349th was transferred to 9th Army in the same Front, on the southern flank of the salient.

On May 10, Colonel Brailyan was succeeded in command by Col. M. G. Ruznyaev, who held the post for about six weeks, until he was replaced at the end of June by Col. Aleksandr Ilich Shchagin, who remained in command until June 1, 1943. Shchagin had previously commanded the 341st Rifle Division in the second Battle of Kharkov.

=== Second Battle of Kharkov ===
Colonel Ruznyaev took command at an unfortunate time, because one week later 9th Army came under attack from the German III Motorized and XXXXIV Army Corps. His division was holding a sector to the southeast of Barvenkovo, with a strength of between 5,000 and 6,000 men. The German offensive did not target the 349th directly, but smashed in the front lines on both flanks, so by day's end on the 17th the division was partly encircled, along with 106th and 335th Rifle Divisions. The next day the beleaguered divisions were able to link up with the remaining units of 5th Cavalry Corps, but a change in direction of the enemy advance cut them off from the crossings to the left bank of the northern Donets River, where 9th Army was trying to reorganize. On May 19,

"Without centralized control, this group of forces broke out of encirclement on their own initiative. At dawn... it arrived at the region of Zavodskaia and, with heavy losses, crossed to the left bank of the river."

By May 22, the 349th was regrouping at Kapitulovka, just east of Izium; despite its losses, it avoided the fate of the 6th and 57th Armies which were pocketed the same day.

=== Battle of the Caucasus ===
As of July 7, when German Army Group A began its part of Operation Blue, the 349th was in the second echelon of 12th Army, manning defenses south of the northern Donets protecting the approaches to Voroshilovgrad and Lisichansk. The division retreated into the Caucasus region under this command; in a report from July 25 its status was described as "remnants", and its strength was likely well under 2,000 men at this time. As of August 1 it was reassigned to 56th Army in the Coastal Operational Group of North Caucasus Front. From the 12th to the 15th the division participated in the defense of Krasnodar against the V Army Corps of German 17th Army, but the city fell on the latter date.

On September 23, 17th Army began a further drive, this time on the Black Sea port of Tuapse. What remained of the 349th was still in 56th Army, now part of the Black Sea Group of Forces in Transcaucasus Front, facing the German 125th Infantry Division, plus parts of the Romanian 19th Infantry and 6th Cavalry Divisions. By October 1 the division is listed as being directly subordinate to the Front, and was apparently out of contact with the enemy, because during the month it was written off as destroyed by German intelligence. On November 1 it was still under Front control, but now in 12th Rifle Corps, with 77th, 261st, and 351st Rifle Divisions. The division would remain in association with the 261st until the war's end.

=== Further service ===
As of January, 1943, the 349th had been allocated to 45th Army in Transcausacus Front, guarding the border with Turkey. In February, the division was reported as having an ethnic makeup of 70% Russians and 30% Turkmen and various Caucasian nationalities. Col. Isidor Andreevich Silagadze took command of the division on June 4, and would hold this command for the duration, being promoted to the rank of Major General on June 3, 1944. The division would remain in this backwater for the duration of the war.

== Postwar ==
The 349th ended the war without any battle honors or unit decorations. In September 1945, it was at Akhaltsikhe, shortly before the 45th Army was disbanded. The 349th Division was disbanded by 1946.
