= Sinyavino =

Sinyavino (Russian: Синявино) is the name of several inhabited localities in Russia.

Urban localities

- Sinyavino, Leningrad Oblast, an urban-type settlement under the administrative jurisdiction of Sinyavinskoye Settlement Municipal Formation in Kirovsky District of Leningrad Oblast; 59°55′N 31°04′E

Rural localities

- Sinyavino, Yantarny, Kaliningrad Oblast, a settlement under the administrative jurisdiction of the urban-type settlement of oblast significance of Yantarny in Kaliningrad Oblast
- Sinyavino, Gusevsky District, Kaliningrad Oblast, a settlement under the administrative jurisdiction of the town of district significance of Gusev in Gusevsky District of Kaliningrad Oblast
- Sinyavino, Kaluga Oblast, a village in Medynsky District of Kaluga Oblast
- Sinyavino, Tula Oblast, a selo in Prigorodny Rural Okrug of Plavsky District in Tula Oblast
