= Krasnogorovka =

Krasnogorovka Красногоровка
- Selo
- Location within Voronezh Oblast Location within Russia
- Coordinates: 49°55′N 40°45′E
- Country: Russia
- Region: Voronezh Oblast
- District: Bogucharsky District
- Time zone: UTC+3:00

Krasnogorovka (Russian: Красногоровка) is a rural locality (a selo) in Dyachenkovskoye Rural Settlement, Bogucharsky District, Voronezh Oblast, Russia. The population was 482 as of 2010. There are 15 streets.

== Geography ==
Krasnogorovka is located 25 km east of Boguchar (the district's administrative centre) by road. Tereshkovo is the nearest rural locality.
