= 222nd Rifle Division =

- Active: 1941–1945
- Country: Soviet Union
- Branch: Red Army
- Type: Infantry
- Size: Division
- Engagements: Operation Barbarossa; Battle of Smolensk (1941); Operation Typhoon; Battle of Moscow; Battles of Rzhev; Operation Büffel; Battle of Smolensk (1943); Orsha offensives (1943); Operation Bagration; Mogilev offensive Minsk offensive Vistula–Oder offensive Battle of Berlin
- Decorations: Order of the Red Banner; Order of Suvorov
- Battle honours: Smolensk; Brandenburg

Commanders
- Notable commanders: Col. Fyodor Aleksandrovich Bobrov; Col. Nikolai Lavrentievich Soldatov; Col. Georgii Borisovich Peters; Maj. Gen. Fyodor Ivanovich Gryzlov; Col. Alexei Nikolaevich Yurin; Col. Grigorii Petrovich Savchuk

The 222nd Rifle Division was an infantry division of the Red Army, originally formed in the months just before the start of the German invasion, based on the shtat (table of organization and equipment) of September 13, 1939. It was formed at Starodub and was considered a "sister" to the 217th Rifle Division. It first saw action in July 1941 as part of 28th Army in the fighting between Smolensk and Roslavl and the division took heavy casualties when it was partly encircled and forced to abandon the latter city in early August. It was again encircled during Operation Typhoon but managed to escape complete destruction and soon came under command of 33rd Army, where it remained for almost the entire length of the war.

During the counteroffensive west of Moscow the division gained ground but was eventually encircled with the rest of its Army and forced to break out again, with substantial losses. It recovered over the following months before joining the summer offensive of 1943, retaking much of the territory it had lost two years earlier, and being awarded a battle honor for the liberation of Smolensk and Roslavl. Over the fall and winter the 222nd took part in the grinding offensives toward Orsha and Vitebsk. During the spring of 1944 it was moved to 2nd Belorussian Front and fought as part of 49th Army in the first stage of Operation Bagration before moving back to 33rd Army, and won the Order of the Red Banner while its commander became a Hero of the Soviet Union. After advancing nearly to the border with East Prussia it was moved with its Army to the Reserve of the Supreme High Command and transferred to 1st Belorussian Front. It broke out from the Puławy bridgehead in the first stage of the Vistula-Oder Offensive and advanced across Poland, gaining additional distinctions in the process. In the final offensive into Germany it drove south of Berlin toward the Elbe River and after the German surrender three of its regiments were decorated for their part in the destruction of German forces en route. The 222nd fought from the first to the last but was soon disbanded.

== Formation ==
The division began forming on March 22, 1941, at Starodub in the Oryol Military District. When completed it had the following order of battle, although it would be modified, temporarily or permanently, on several occasions:

- 757th Rifle Regiment (later 457th)
- 774th Rifle Regiment
- 787th Rifle Regiment (later 479th)
- 666th Artillery Regiment (later 664th)
- 722nd Howitzer Artillery Regiment (until October 15, 1941)
- 43rd Antitank Battalion
- 297th Reconnaissance Company (later 297th Reconnaissance Battalion)
- 389th Sapper Battalion
- 602nd Signal Battalion (later 602nd and 426th Signal Companies)
- 391st Medical/Sanitation Battalion
- 309th Chemical Defense (Anti-gas) Company
- 261st Motor Transport Company
- 351st Field Bakery (later 484th and 353rd Field Bakeries)
- 124th Divisional Veterinary Hospital (later 170th)
- 317th Field Postal Station
- 42nd Field Office of the State Bank

Col. Fyodor Aleksandrovich Bobrov took command on the day the division began forming; he had previously served as the deputy commander of the 149th Rifle Division. It took 10 – 14 days after the start of the German invasion for it to complete its formation and incorporate mobilized reservists and equipment before it could go into battle. By July 1 it had been incorporated into the 33rd Rifle Corps of the separate 28th Army in the Reserve of the Supreme High Command.

=== Battle for Roslavl ===
By July 10 the 217th had joined the 222nd and the 145th Rifle Divisions in 33rd Corps, which was still in the Reserve. 28th Army was under command of Lt. Gen. V. I. Kachalov and by late July was being referred to as Group Kachalov. The Group consisted of the 222nd, 145th and 149th Rifle Divisions plus the 104th Tank Division on July 23 as Army Group Center was trying to eliminate the Soviet forces that were partly encircled near Smolensk. The latter two rifle divisions attacked northward along the Roslavl–Smolensk road with 104th Tanks on the right flank and the 222nd remaining west of Roslavl to protect the left. This made some progress against Großdeutschland Motorized Regiment and a battlegroup of 18th Panzer Division, driving them back toward Pochinok and Yelnya. The Soviet forces had a tendency to make costly frontal attacks without adequate tank or artillery support and this effort was halted by the end of July 27. The next day the 222nd relieved a composite regiment that Kachalov had cobbled together and the following day was ordered to defend the city of Roslavl.

On July 29 the STAVKA ordered Kachalov to bring the 21st Mountain Cavalry and 52nd Cavalry Divisions forward from the Army reserve to protect his left flank west of Roslavl and reorganize to renew his attacks. At the same time Army Group Center was planning to eliminate Group Kachalov with its XXIV Panzer Corps. At this time Roslavl was 65 km beyond the German front lines. As of August 1 the 222nd had been reassigned to Reserve Front's 43rd Army, joining the 217th and 53rd Rifle Divisions. The German attack began the same day and quickly broke through Kachalov's left flank before wheeling east along the Roslavl road, led by 4th Panzer Division. The assault overran the two cavalry divisions, splitting them apart and forcing them to with withdraw in disorder before turning the 222nd's left flank. The panzers were joined by infantry of VII Army Corps advancing on the city from the west and the division was effectively routed. Somewhat late, Kachalov ordered antitank reinforcements to the sector, but the end of August 2 4th Panzer was within 15 km of the western outskirts of Roslavl. In spite of this threat, under pressure from the STAVKA Kachalov continued to order attacks to the north, which were effectively suicidal under the circumstances.

Roslavl fell to 4th Panzer on August 3, blocking the highway to Moscow and encircling the bulk of Group Kachalov. At 1730 hours the chief of staff of Reserve Front, Maj. Gen. P. I. Lyapin, managed to get a report to his new commander, Army Gen. G. K. Zhukov, describing the previous and current day's events:

I am reporting about the state of matters at Roslavl'... the enemy has launched an attack against the 222nd Division's entire front... The 222nd Division repelled the enemy's attacks up to 1900 hours by employing its shock groups. By 2000 hours the enemy managed to penetrate along separate axes and approached Polshino and Hill 234.0. However, it was never threatening, and our infantry held on firmly. At 2300 hours on 2 August, the division's commander and commissar reached the units to organize the defenses... Yesterday 4 bombers were shot down by the division's light weapons... According to a report received by 43rd Army's headquarters at 1400 hours on 3 August, as a result of the fighting, 222nd RD turned out to be half-encircled on the morning of 3 August and began a fighting withdrawal to the line of the Oster River at 0800 with the objective of blocking the Moscow and Bryansk highway. The division suffered significant losses in the fighting on 1 and 2 August, the scope of which is being clarified, but at the same time, also inflicted heavy personnel and tank losses on the enemy. The division's 774th Regiment was cut off during the fighting and remained in the Laskovo and Zhabinskoe region. The division commander believes that this regiment will come out on Group Kachalov's left flank. The 222nd seized operational documents from the enemy tank corps...

Zhukov began taking measures to rescue Group Kachalov, including the 774th Regiment. He ordered the commander of 43rd Army, Lt. Gen. I. G. Zakharin, to reinforce his defenses along the Desna River. He also radioed orders to Kachalov as to how he was to withdraw and link up with the remainder of the 222nd, but this officer was killed in a skirmish north of Roslavl on August 4. His deputy chief-of-staff, Maj. Gen. F. A. Zuev, took over and overnight directed the 774th Regiment, with two battalions of artillery, to provide a rearguard for the Group as it attempted to break out. At 0312 hours on August 5, Zhukov contacted Zuev with "instructions", in which he put the bulk of the blame for the situation on Bobrov and his division:

The actions of 222nd RD are clearly criminal. To date, the commander of the division and the commanders and commissars of its units have failed to put the division in order and are continuing to fight in disorganized fashion, while retreating to the east without any sort of orders... Warn the division commander and the commanders and commissars of the units that, if they do not correct the situation and continue to retreat further without orders, the commanders of the division and the units will be arrested and tried in court as traitors to the Motherland... Use the remnants of 222nd RD to reinforce 53rd RD, restore order to the remnants of Group Kachalov and place them in second echelon behind 53rd RD...

Just after midnight on August 7, Reserve Front reported to the STAVKA what had happened in the pocket based on the testimony of survivors. According to German sources Group Kachalov lost 80 percent of its initial force, including 250 tanks and other tracked vehicles, 713 guns and almost 2,000 trucks and other vehicles.

==== Battle of Yelnya ====
As the situation stabilized by the end of August 14 the 43rd Army had established its headquarters as Kirov and had the 53rd, 217th and 222nd Rifle, 105th Tank, and 106th Motorized (former 221st Motorized) Divisions, plus significant artillery assets, under command. The STAVKA began planning for a new offensive against Army Group Guderian and issued orders at 0235 hours on August 25 which directed the 222nd and 53rd Divisions to defend the Army's positions at Spas-Demensk and Kirov while the remainder of the Army attacked toward Roslavl on August 30 in conjunction with 24th Army. This effort initially went well as four divisions thrust across the Desna and penetrated the VII Corps' defenses between its 23rd and 197th Infantry Divisions. After an advance of up to 6 km westward the group was halted the following day by German reserves and after the 211th Rifle Division was routed it and the other attacking Soviet divisions broke off their attack and retreated to the Desna's eastern bank.

== Operation Typhoon ==
By the end of September the division was operating under a hybrid shtat. It was still authorized the same number of mortars as prewar but the artillery and machine guns had been cut in half as per the July wartime shtat; it would officially lose its howitzer regiment on October 15. Although there is no official documentation of this type of organization available it may have been a local emergency authorization. In any case the division was understrength. On October 1 it was still in 43rd Army of Reserve Front and had 9,446 personnel on strength, but only 72 of 163 LMGs authorized; 38 of 108 HMGs; 19 of 81 50mm, 8 of 54 82mm, and 2 of 18 120mm mortars required. There were only 25 artillery pieces in the division, including regimental guns, plus 13 antitank guns and no antiaircraft weapons at all. At this time the 757th Rifle Regiment had been redesignated as, or replaced by, the 457th Regiment.

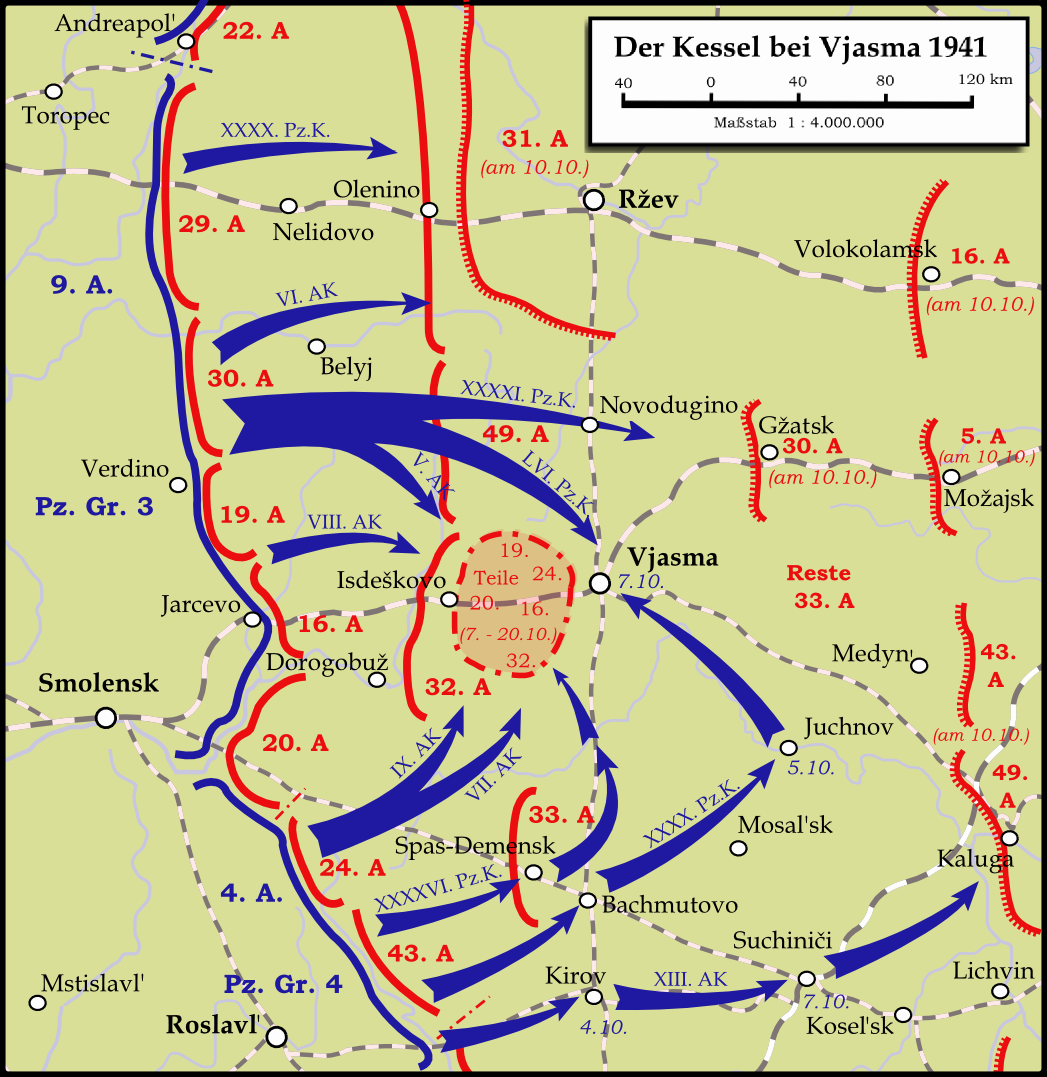
Operation Typhoon. Note positions of 43rd and 24th Armies.

Despite these shortages the division continued to act on the offensive; on September 24 it had joined with the 145th Tank Brigade in an attempt to drive German forces from a bridgehead they held on the east bank of the Striana River. 43rd Army was defending a 70 km-wide sector covering the Yukhnov axis with three rifle divisions in first echelon and one in second echelon; the 222nd and 211th Divisions were protecting the left flank. By this time intelligence indicated that German forces were massing on the Roslavl–Spas-Demensk axis. At 0615 hours on October 2 a 15-minute artillery preparation began along the Army's entire sector, followed by the actual assault. The 222nd was struck by one infantry division while the 211th faced a division and part of another, along with a battalion of tanks. By noon the front had been breached, following which a panzer and a motorized division were committed through the gap toward Spas-Demensk. The next day it became clear that the entire Army was in an unauthorized retreat into the sector of Marshal S. M. Budyonny's Bryansk Front and he ordered the 222nd to come under his operational control while 43rd Army took up a line along the Snopot River. The division was subordinated to 24th Army by the morning of October 6 and Budyonny ordered that Army to defend the line of the Ushitsa River to Gorodechnia. During the previous day German reports claimed that it had been encircled and crushed south and southeast of Spas-Demensk.

Through this chaos Colonel Bobrov managed to maintain control of the remnants of his division and by the evening of October 6 it was located in the area of Moloshino along with the badly damaged 8th Rifle Division and 144th Tank Brigade. At this time the 24th Army was fighting in semi-encirclement which became total on October 8. The next morning the 222nd, along with many of the Army's other retreating elements, began to arrive in the area of Panfilovo and to the south. Bobrov led his troops to the north during the breakout, rather than the east as the German command expected. During this action he sustained a shoulder wound but managed to cross the German lines with his remaining troops near Naro-Fominsk and they were soon put back in the line near there and Kubinka while Bobrov reported to hospital, being replaced in command on October 15 by Col. Timofei Yakovlevich Novikov. By the beginning of November the division came under command of the rebuilding 33rd Army in Western Front. With two brief exceptions it would remain in this Army for the duration of the war.

== Battle of Moscow ==
As of November 16 the Army, under command of Lt. Gen. M. G. Yefremov, was constructing defenses along its entire front in anticipation of a renewed offensive on Moscow; it had just four divisions under command. The 222nd was defending an 11 km-wide sector from Myakshevo to outside Naro-Fominsk. Colonel Novikov left the division on November 28 and was briefly replaced by the commander of the 774th Rifle Regiment, Col. Mikhail Osipovich Leshchinsky, until Colonel Bobrov returned from hospital on December 8. Novikov went on to command the 181st Rifle Division, being taken prisoner when it was surrounded near Stalingrad in August 1942, and died in German captivity.

The fighting resumed on the morning of December 1 when a powerful German artillery and mortar bombardment struck along the entire front of 33rd Army, except the sector defended by the 222nd. Under cover of this fire as well as airstrikes the German forces launched an attack against the Army's left flank. With Yefremov thus distracted a German motorized force, supported by 60-70 tanks, forced the Nara River near the village of Novaya and, pressing forward, reached the Naro-Fominsk–Kubinka road, after which they continued to attack in the direction of the Minsk–Moscow highway. Their progress was slowed by the division's resistance as well as obstacles, including mines that knocked out several tanks; it was only at 1600 hours that panzers reached Akulovo. The 110th Rifle Division was also attacked south of Naro-Fominsk and its front was penetrated. These advances threatened the rear of 5th Army, but the situation was restored by that Army's 32nd Rifle Division which took up a defensive position near Akulovo. A combination of obstacles, mines and antitank fire caused the panzers to bunch up near the road, leaving them vulnerable to direct artillery fire and infantry using Molotov cocktails. As many as 35 tanks were knocked out and the German column fell back to try another route. By December 3–4 the main fighting was occurring in the Yushkevo–Burtsevo area and by the end of the next day the Red Army claimed to have inflicted 7,500 casualties as well as 27 tanks, two armored cars, 36 guns, ten mortars, and other trophies. Meanwhile, the 110th halted and then cleared up the breakthrough on its sector and the German forces on the 33rd Army's front were forced back to their start line on the Nara.

=== Soviet Counteroffensive ===
33rd Army began its main counteroffensive on December 18. Yefremov had been tasked to break through along the Naro-Fominsk–Kamenskoye sector with the main blow directed at Balabanovo and Maloyaroslavets; his Army was facing the depleted 3rd Motorized, 183rd Infantry, and 20th Panzer Divisions, plus part of 15th Infantry Division. He formed a shock group from his 110th, 113th and 338th Rifle Divisions and 1st Guards Motorized Rifle Division while the 222nd acted in a pinning role and the 201st Rifle Division formed the second echelon. The shock group deployed on a 16 km-wide frontage while the 222nd covered a 14 km sector. The offensive was planned in conjunction with the adjacent 43rd Army. The attack began following an hour-long artillery preparation. By the end of December 20, despite the commitment of the 201st Division, the offensive was developing poorly and the Army's units remained approximately in the places they had begun.

By the early days of January 1942 the armies of Western Front were pushing toward the Ruza River, which the German forces had made into a major defensive position. 33rd Army was fighting for Borovsk while its right flank, mainly the 222nd, had managed to reach a line from Maurino to Cheshkovo. This provided an opening for the 5th Army to outflank the German positions along the Ruza rather than the 33rd making a frontal assault. On the night of January 5/6 the 32nd Division relieved elements of the 82nd Motorized Division and attacked from the line Bolshie Semenychi–Lyubanovo in cooperation with the 222nd. Despite heavy resistance and several counterattacks the 32nd captured the first line of German trenches on January 7/8 and by the end of the 9th had completed its penetration and was in pursuit. Following this the 5th Army went over to a general offensive and by January 16 the German Ruza grouping was facing encirclement by the 33rd, 5th and 16th Armies, forcing it to withdraw in the direction of Mozhaysk.

At 1000 hours on the same day the 222nd took Monakovo and began fighting for Kupelitsy. This yielded no definite results until the 1st Guards Motorized arrived to help. Despite the threat of encirclement and heavy losses the German force held its positions. On January 19 the two divisions, assisted by the 113th, took possession of the town of Vereya after breaking through the German defenses. As it pursued overnight on January 23/24 the 222nd ran into a German grouping in fortified positions in the Ponomarikhi area, leading to prolonged fighting. Further reconnaissance revealed several other strongpoints along the routes of the majority of 33rd Army's divisions moving to the west, leading to numerous small engagements over the following days. On January 26 the division was reported as fighting for Rodionkovo, Yesovtsy, and Voditskoe with the addition of one regiment of the 110th Division under its command. Complicating these operations were extreme cold temperatures, as low as -35 degrees C.

=== Rzhev-Vyazma Offensive ===
General Zhukov, who was now in command of Western Front, on January 30 ordered the Army's shock group to push ahead vigorously to cover a distance of 25 km by 90 km in less than two days and "in the future cooperate with Group Belov to seize Vyazma". This thrust was made by the 113th, 338th and 160th Rifle Divisions while the remainder of the Army was effectively stalled. The three divisions entered the fighting 7–8 km south and southeast of the city on February 1. As the Army fought for Vyazma the German High Command was already taking steps to counter the penetration. Up to six understrength divisions had been moved to the area and on February 2–3 Soviet gains north and south of Yukhnov were driven back, leaving the 33rd, as well as 1st Guards Cavalry Corps and the 8th Airborne Brigade all but completely encircled. Zhukov ordered the 43rd Army to break through to the encircled group; this effort would also soon involve the 49th and 50th Armies. However, the command of Army Group Center reinforced its troops defending Yukhnov and all attempts to break in failed. The supply situation soon became catastrophic, especially given the lack of air transport. The 33rd turned to local partisans for assistance and support, drafting local men into the ranks under an order signed by Stalin on February 9. For most purposes the pocketed Army operated as partisans over the next months.

At the beginning of March an attempt was made the breach the ring of encirclement by units of 33rd Army from within and a shock group of 43rd Army from without. The German command brought up additional forces. The gap between the two attacking Soviet groups narrowed to just 2 km but they were unable to overcome the remaining distance. Conditions inside the pocket worsened on a daily basis. On March 11 a total of 12,780 personnel remained trapped and a report by Western Front's chief of the NKVD Special Department (dated April 8) stated in part:

... a significant amount of the artillery has been idled by a lack of fuel and ammunition. Casualties from 1 February to 13 March 1942 amount to 1,290 killed and 2,351 wounded. We are not receiving replacements... Sustenance... consists of a small quantity of boiled rye and horse meat. There is no salt, fats or sugar at all. Due to the starvation diet, cases of illness among the troops are becoming more frequent... on the night of 14 March, two soldiers died of emaciation.

Further orders from the Front demanded that 43rd, 49th and 50th Armies relieve the pocket by March 27, but the general exhaustion of the Red Army after months of counterattacking, plus the onset of the spring rasputitsa, doomed these efforts to failure. Meanwhile, Army Group Center was determined to clear its rear areas. Seven divisions were concentrated against the pocket which was soon reduced to an area of roughly 10 km by 25 km. In early April the 33rd was finally authorized to withdraw through forests under partisan control in the direction of Kirov, a distance of up to 180 km. In the attempt General Yefremov was wounded and took his own life to avoid capture. Only a few thousand men managed to filter out to friendly lines.

== Battles of Rzhev ==
As of the beginning of May the 33rd Army consisted of just five battered rifle divisions. During the early summer it would remain in a four-division (110th, 113th, 160th, 222nd) configuration after the 338th was disbanded to provide replacements. On July 12 Colonel Bobrov left the division, being replaced by Col. Nikolai Lavrentievich Soldatov until August 25 when Col. Georgii Borisovich Peters took over. Bobrov would go on to command the 42nd Guards Rifle Division and be promoted to the rank of major general before he was killed near Piatra Neamț on September 25, 1944, when his jeep ran over a mine. His body was sent to Chernivtsi for burial and he was posthumously made a Hero of the Soviet Union on April 28, 1945.

In the planning for Western Front's summer offensive against the eastern face of the Rzhev salient at least one map-solution was prepared in June for a prospective offensive by 49th, 33rd and 5th Armies to seize Vyazma, although this came to nothing. As the planning continued 33rd Army was also considered for advances in the direction of Gzhatsk and west of Medyn. In the end the Army was to be given a large role in the offensive. When the it joined on August 13 it had been reinforced with the 7th Guards Rifle Corps, two more divisions and four rifle brigades. It faced six German infantry regiments along the front line on its breakthrough sector but had only a 3.5:1 advantage in infantry and 1.6:1 in artillery, considerably less than the other Soviet armies involved, apart from 30th Army on the opposite end of the offensive front. Given this relative weakness in force correlation and the fact that the main offensive had begun more than a week earlier, eliminating any element of surprise, the attack of 33rd Army soon faltered.

The Army resumed its offensive on August 24 and made some penetrations on 3rd Panzer Army's front, but these were soon contained. Another effort began on September 4 in conjunction with 5th Army, but was halted three days later. During this period 20th Army was also attempting to reach Gzhatsk but went over to the defense on September 8. For the rest of the month the southern armies of the Front were officially engaged in "battles of local significance". From August 10 to September 15 the personnel losses of 33rd Army are listed as 42,327 killed, wounded and missing while gaining from 20 to 25 km to the west and northwest. The heavy losses were attributed to "densely-packed formations... [while] there was almost no coordination between fire and maneuver..." among other factors.

=== Operation Mars ===
In planning for the next offensive General Zhukov conceived a two-phase operation beginning against the northern part of the salient to be known as Operation Mars, with a subsequent phase to the south likely under the name of Operation Jupiter. During October and November the German 9th Army noted a Soviet buildup in the sector east of Vyasma, including the 3rd Tank Army, two tank corps, and reinforcements for 5th Army. 33rd Army would also take part. Due to postponements Mars did not begin until November 25, at which time the start date for the second phase was tentatively set for December 1. By then Mars was badly bogged down and although Zhukov continued to hope Jupiter could be implemented as late as December 9, on December 16 Stalin ordered the 3rd Tank Army to move south. Colonel Soldatov had returned to command of the 222nd on November 3; Colonel Peters was moved to the 110th Division and would later be promoted to major general, commanding the 84th Guards Rifle Division until the end of the war and becoming a Hero of the Soviet Union. Soldatov would in turn be replaced by Col. Fyodor Ivanovich Gryzlov on February 27, 1943, who would be promoted to major general on September 15.

=== Operation Büffel ===
Operation Büffel. Note position of 33rd Army southeast of Vyazma ("Wjasma").

33rd Army was still southeast of Vyazma at the beginning of March when 9th Army began its withdrawal from the Rzhev salient. The withdrawal caught the Red Army on the wrong foot and turned into a pursuit by stages despite its best efforts to cut off at least part of the German forces. Both sides were hindered by the spring rasputitsa, but 9th Army also conducted a relentless scorched-earth campaign, destroying towns and villages, roads and especially bridges. 33rd Army entered the pursuit on March 5, bypassing Tyomkino to the north in the direction of Vyazma, fighting over much of the same ground where it had been encircled a year earlier.

The combined forces of the 5th and 33rd Armies finally liberated the Vyazma region on March 12, with the 110th Rifle Division leading the 33rd into the city proper. The next day Col. Gen. V. D. Sokolovskii, the new commander of Western Front, committed the 1st and 5th Tank Corps into the pursuit. Despite these reinforcements the Front soon ran into the extensive German defenses that had been built along the base of the salient. Beginning on March 18 shock groups of the 33rd, 49th and 50th Armies, totalling about eight rifle divisions and seven tank brigades, mounted a major attack at Spas-Demensk, but this expired on April 1 after heavy casualties owing to supply difficulties and heavy fortifications.

== Smolensk Offensive ==
During the following months both sides took a much-needed breathing space to rebuild and replenish their forces in preparation for the summer offensives. The STAVKA chose to stand on the defensive in the Kursk region and absorb the attacks of 9th Army and 4th Panzer Army before going over to the counteroffensive. Western Front prepared for its own offensive in the direction of Smolensk and 33rd Army, now under command of Lt. Gen. V. N. Gordov, was substantially reinforced with armor and artillery by the beginning of August.

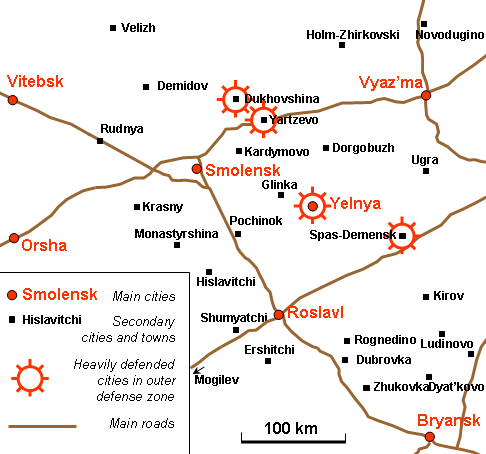
General layout of Smolensk region during the battle.

Operation Suvorov began on August 7. 33rd Army was still facing the defenses at the base of the former Rzhev salient (the Büffel-Stellung) east of Spas-Demensk. At this time its divisions averaged 6,500 - 7,000 personnel each (70 - 75 percent of their authorized strength). Gordov formed his main shock group from three rifle divisions and the 256th Tank Brigade (the 222nd remained in reserve) but these ran into tough resistance from the 480th Grenadier Regiment of the 260th Infantry Division in the Kurkino sector. Only the 164th Rifle Division achieved a limited success, taking the village of Chotilovka and threatening to drive a wedge between that German regiment and its neighboring 460th Grenadier Regiment until the 480th threw in its reserve battalion and stopped any further advance. By early afternoon Sokolovskii was becoming frustrated about the inability of most his units to advance. The offensive resumed at 0730 hours on August 8 after a 30-minute artillery preparation, but 33rd Army made little further progress. It continued attacking on August 9–10 with the shock group on a very narrow front and made limited gains at the village of Sluzna, but was then stymied at Laski and Gubino; the intervention of an ersatz German battalion appears to have narrowly prevented a Soviet breakthrough. As both sides weakened the fighting continued into the morning of August 13 when the 42nd Rifle Division and the 256th Tanks were the first units of 33rd Army into Spas-Demensk. Sokolovskii was forced to call a temporary halt on August 14 to replenish stocks, especially ammunition.

Sokolovskii's revised plan put his Front's main effort in the center with the 21st, 33rd, 68th and 10th Guards Armies attacking the German XII Army Corps all along its front until it shattered, then push mobile groups through the gaps to liberate Yelnya. Virtually all the units on both sides were now well below authorized strength and Suvorov was becoming an endurance contest. Ammunition and fuel were still short on the Soviet side given the competing demands of other fronts.

At 0800 hours on August 28 the Western Front began a 90-minute artillery preparation across a 25 km-wide front southeast of Yelnya in the sectors of the 10th Guards, 21st and 33rd Armies. Instead of the obvious axis of advance straight up the railway to the city Sokolovskii decided to make his main effort in the 33rd Army sector near Novaya Berezovka. This assault struck the 20th Panzergrenadier Division directly, forcing it backward and away from its junction with the right flank of IX Army Corps. As soon as a gap was forced General Gordov committed the 5th Mechanized Corps at Koshelevo which began to shove wrecked German battlegroups out of its path. Overall the Army managed to advance as much as 8 km during the day. On August 29 the 5th Mechanized completed its breakthrough and Gordov was able to add the 6th Guards Cavalry Corps to the exploitation force. By 1330 hours on August 30 it became clear to the German command that Yelnya could not be held and orders for its evacuation were issued within minutes; the city was in Red Army hands by 1900. From here it was only 75 km to Smolensk. However, German 4th Army was able to establish a tenuous new front by September 3 and although Sokolovskii continued local attacks through the rest of the week his Front was again brought to a halt by logistical shortages.

=== Liberation of Smolensk ===
The offensive was renewed at 0545 hours on September 15 with another 90-minute artillery preparation is support of the 68th, 10th Guards, 21st and 33rd Armies against the positions of IX Army Corps west of Yelnya. This Corps was attempting to hold a 40 km-wide front with five decimated divisions. The 78th Assault Division buckled under the onslaught, but the Soviet armies gained 3 km at the most, instead of a clear penetration. Nevertheless, at 1600 on September 16 the IX Corps was ordered to fall back to the next defense line. Sokolovskii now directed the 21st and 33rd Armies to pivot to the southwest to cut the Smolensk–Roslavl railway near Pochinok. On the morning of September 25 Smolensk was liberated, and for its part in this victory the division was awarded its first battle honor:

SMOLENSK - 222nd Rifle Division (Major General Gryzlov, Fyodor Ivanovich)... The troops who participated in the battles of Smolensk and Roslavl, by the order of the Supreme High Command of 25 September 1943, and a commendation in Moscow, are given a salute of 20 artillery salvoes from 224 guns.

During the following days the 33rd Army pushed on toward Mogilev.

== Orsha Offensives ==
As of October 1 the 33rd Army was still facing the depleted 78th Assault and 252nd Infantry Divisions of IX Corps roughly halfway between the Sozh and Dniepr Rivers. For the new attack set for October 3 the 222nd was initially held in reserve. Meanwhile, the two German divisions had been reassigned to XX Army Corps, joining the 95th and 342nd Infantry Divisions. This provided a stronger defense than was faced by most of Western Front's armies, and the Army's assaults expired by October 9 without achieving any success.

Following a substantial regrouping which saw the Army moving north to positions near Lenino that had been occupied by 21st Army, Gordov deployed his 42nd and 290th Rifle and 1st Polish Infantry Divisions in first echelon with 164th and 222nd Divisions in second echelon to assault German positions across the Myareya River just north of Lenino. The offensive began early on October 12 following an 85-minute artillery preparation which failed to take the defenders by surprise. In two days of fighting the Western Front armies were almost completely stymied; the Polish Division was able to carve out a wedge up to 3 km deep west of Lenino at considerable cost, especially due to air attacks. The 222nd was committed on October 15 to the battle for a bridgehead between that place and Baevo but this also yielded meagre gains. When the offensive ended on the 18th it had cost the Poles nearly 3,000 casualties and 33rd Army's remaining divisions a further 1,700 personnel. Shortly after this the division joined the 144th and 153rd Rifle Divisions under the command of 65th Rifle Corps.

Sokolovskii planned for another offensive on Orsha to begin on November 14. Two shock groups were prepared, with the southern group consisting of elements of 5th And 33rd Armies south of the Dniepr on a 12 km-wide sector. It would be supported with an artillery and air preparation of 3 1/2 hours duration as well as significant strength in armor. At this time the Front's rifle divisions averaged about 4,500 men each. 65th Corps was deployed between Volkolakovka and Rusany with the 222nd in the first echelon. When the attack began it pushed westward in tandem with the 42nd Division and reached the outskirts of Guraki but the remainder of the Army's first echelon divisions faltered in the face of withering artillery and machine gun fire. The following day General Gordov committed the 153rd and 164th Divisions in repeated attacks against the positions of 18th Panzergrenadier Division in Guraki, to no avail. Only by releasing the 144th to battle on November 17 was his Army able to secure a 10 km-wide and 3–4 km deep bridgehead on the west bank of the Rossasenka River by the end of the next day, at which point the offensive collapsed from exhaustion. The entire effort, which was most successful on 33rd Army's sector, cost Western Front's four attacking armies 38,756 casualties. In preparation for a fifth offensive on Orsha Gordov shifted additional forces into the Rossasenka bridgehead, and in the attack which began on November 30 his divisions, in cooperation with 5th Army, managed to force the defenders back roughly 4 km before the lines stabilized. Sokolovskii ordered the Front over to the defense on December 5.

=== Battles for Vitebsk ===
Shortly after this 33rd Army was directed to redeploy substantially to the north to reinforce the left wing of 1st Baltic Front as it attempted to encircle and liberate the city of Vitebsk. When the redeployment and regrouping were through on December 22 the Army had 13 rifle divisions on strength, supported by one tank corps, four tank brigades, and ten tank and self-propelled artillery regiments, plus substantial artillery. The attack began the following day in cooperation with 39th Army. 65th Corps was deployed north of Khotemle against the 246th Infantry Division with the 23rd Guards Tank Brigade in support. The shock groups forced the defenders back about 1,000 metres on the first day but the commitment of second echelon divisions on December 24 enlarged the penetration to a depth of 2–3 km. Despite the arrival of a battlegroup of Feldherrnhalle Panzergrenadier Division on December 25 the entire 33rd Army burst forward from 2–7 km, reaching to within 20 km of Vitebsk's city center. By the end of December 28 the 222nd had reached the village of Kopti, across the Vitebsk–Smolensk railway. On January 1, 1944, it was withdrawn with the 42nd Division for a brief rest. Further efforts by the two Armies that day pushed to within a few hundred metres of the Vitebsk–Orsha road before German reserves intervened and the offensive expired on January 6 after minimal additional gains. 33rd Army suffered 33,500 personnel killed, wounded or missing, plus the loss of 34 mortars and 67 guns.

==== Third Vitebsk Offensive ====
The offensive was renewed on January 8. 65th Corps had the 173rd Rifle Division in first echelon on a 6 km-wide sector facing the 131st Infantry Division, with the 222nd and 44th Rifle Divisions in second echelon. As this was the most heavily defended sector the Corps was to remain on the defensive initially and then to support the adjacent 199th Rifle Division of 36th Rifle Corps in crossing the Luchesa River. Although the 199th failed to reach its objectives the remainder of 36th Corps made gains of up to 4 km over several days fighting; this was the limit of the progress and the effort was suspended on January 14. By now the rifle divisions in 33rd Army numbered 2,500 to 3,500 men each, rifle regiments consisted of one or two battalions, battalions of one or two companies, and companies, 18 to 25 men each.

In an effort to revive the offensive Sokolovskii authorized a further major regrouping in which the 222nd, 199th and 173rd Divisions were transferred south to 5th Army, with the 222nd now part of 36th Corps. This attack, beginning on January 15, was intended to push south along the Vitebsk–Smolensk railway in an effort to widen the salient south east of the former city. In the face of a blizzard the attackers gained only about 2 km. After a further regrouping a new assault began on January 20 but did no better and ended on the 24th. By the beginning of February the division had returned to 33rd Army, now in 69th Rifle Corps.

When the offensive was renewed again on February 3 the 69th Corps was part of the Army's shock group, assigned to continue the drive to encircle Vitebsk from the south, although now aiming for a far shallower envelopment. The Corps was deployed in the sector between Ugliane and Vaskova with the 222nd and 144th Rifle Divisions in first echelon and the 42nd Division behind, facing the 206th Infantry Division. The artillery preparation was again hindered by ammunition shortages but despite this the first echelon pierced the German forward defenses and pushed on 2 km, capturing strongpoints at Novka, Bondary and Laputi. Gordov ordered his corps commanders to commit their second echelon divisions the next day, but the Luchesa, only partly frozen and with deep, steep banks, proved a formidable obstacle. The 206th Infantry was reinforced by a battlegroup from the 246th Infantry and held the 69th Corps to meagre gains over the next three days of fighting, reaching north of Shapury but no farther.

Sokolovskii and Gordov now desperately sought some weak spot in the defenses they could exploit and focused all their efforts on the Shapury sector which was their closest point to the center of Vitebsk. 69th Corps was assigned to a 4 km-wide frontage from Ugliane to the Vitebsk–Orsha railway while 65th Corps took over its former sector. Five more days of heavy fighting began on February 8. The 222nd and 42nd Divisions drove a small wedge into the German lines along the railway only to again be halted by reinforcements from the 246th Infantry. The next day the 42nd and 144th Divisions, with additional tank support, pushed ahead another 2 km before a battlegroup of 20th Panzer Division forced a halt. Again exhausted by heavy losses the Corps went over to the defense and while 65th and 81st Rifle Corps fought on for three more days all the assaults after February 13 proved futile. The STAVKA finally called a halt on February 16.

==== Fourth and Fifth Vitebsk Offensives ====
A renewed offensive was planned to begin on February 29 and in preparation the Corps was formed into a three-echelon formation to assault the German defenses from just north of Perevoz to Bukshtyny and force the Luchesa before advancing to Ostrovno. Before it could begin the commander of the 3rd Panzer Army, Col. Gen. G.-H. Reinhardt, disrupted the plan by shortening his defensive line around the city. The STAVKA took this as a preliminary to a full withdrawal from the Vitebsk salient, and ordered a pursuit. In response Sokolovskii removed the 222nd and moved it northward to reinforce his 39th Army for its presumed westward pursuit along the Vitebsk–Smolensk road. It soon became apparent that, instead of withdrawing, 3rd Panzer was preparing a defense that would guarantee another series of frontal assaults. Due to its redeployment the division saw little fighting before the offensive collapsed on March 5.

After several weeks for replenishment, and to wait for the spring rasputitsa to abate, Western Front prepared for yet another offensive against Vitebsk. By mid-March the 222nd had returned to 69th Corps in 33rd Army. Sokolovskii returned to his strategy of mid-January, planning to expand the salient southeast of Vitebsk farther to the south, this time employing three rifle corps, including the 69th, on a 12 km-wide front, supported by two tank brigades. The Corps deployed its 36th Rifle Brigade to cover the 222nd and 42nd Divisions as they moved into position to its rear; just prior to the offensive this positioning was reversed. The two divisions now in first echelon were on a 3.5-km sector from Makarova to the Vitebsk–Orsha road, facing the 299th Infantry Division. The assault began at dawn on March 21 and collapsed the German defenses on the entire front from Makarova to Diakovina, allowing penetrations of up to 4 km. The 222nd captured the strongpoint at Sheliai. The following day, however, 69th Corps failed to make any further gains. A renewed effort on March 23 fared very little better, and the addition of the 352nd Rifle Division to the Corps the next day made no real difference as German reserves continued to arrive. Fighting continued until March 29 but by the 27th it was clear to both sides that the offensive had faltered. Furthermore, given losses of 20,630 men from March 21–30 there was nothing he could do to reinvigorate it.

== Operation Bagration ==
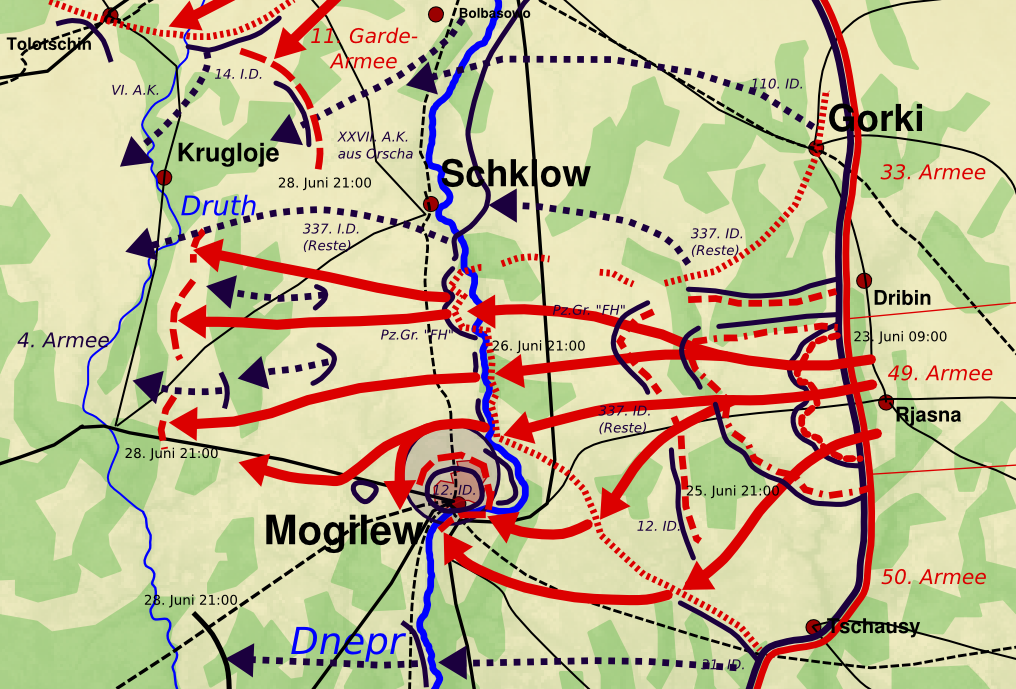
Operation Bagration, Mogilev sector

The failures of Western Front and its massive losses prompted a massive command restructuring during April, in which Sokolovskii, Gordov and Gryzlov all lost their jobs. The latter was placed at the disposal of the Main Personnel Directorate on April 12 but within two months would take command of the 156th Rifle Division which he would lead until nearly the end of the war. Col. Semyon Ipatievich Stanovskii took over the 222nd, but he would be replaced on May 16 by Col. Alexei Nikolaevich Yurin. Meanwhile, Western Front was broken up and by the beginning of May the 33rd Army, as well as the division and its 69th Corps, was under command of 2nd Belorussian Front.

In the buildup to the summer offensive 33rd Army was stripped of most of its forces and 69th Corps (222nd and 42nd Divisions) was transferred to 49th Army, which commanded the bulk of the Front's strength. The Army, commanded by Lt. Gen. I. T. Grishin, had received fresh replacements for its rifle divisions in June and deployed at and south of Mogilev, primarily facing the XXXIX Panzer Corps of 4th Army. Grishin's first mission was to pin down 4th Army's forces while the Soviet Fronts to the north and south achieved penetrations. His Army would then seize Mogilev and drive toward Minsk. At Hitler's insistence 4th Army was holding on to a pointless bridgehead on the east bank of the Dniepr rather than incorporating the river into its defenses. 69th Corps deployed from outside Khalyupy to outside Kareby and was intended to secure the north flank of the Army's shock group (70th and 81st Rifle Corps) and tie in to 33rd Army. The 69th and 81st Corps had the 233rd Assault Air Division (Il-2s) in support.

After a reconnaissance-in-force on June 22 and airstrikes overnight the artillery preparation the next morning was delayed by two hours due to fog. Despite this, by 0930 hours reinforced rifle companies had forced crossings of the Pronya River. By the end of the artillery preparation the Army's first echelon divisions had gained most of the German second line of trenches, and in places part of the third. At 1000 hours tanks and self-propelled artillery operating in support of 69th Corps began crossing the Pronya as well, but many became bogged in the soil of the river's flood plain; these conditions also slowed the advance of the artillery and other heavy weapons. These delays gave the defenders a respite to restore their fire system and 69th Corps was forced to commit its second echelon, but with limited supporting fire this did not yield any effective results.

Late in the day the Feldherrnhalle Division was brought up to support the 337th Infantry Division facing 69th Corps, making numerous counterattacks, but despite this the commander of 4th Army requested permission to withdraw behind the Dniepr, which was denied. On the morning of June 24 the 49th Army, supported by 121st Rifle Corps of 50th Army, renewed the assault against both divisions following a massive 30-minute artillery preparation. By noon a gap in the defense had been opened east of Chernevka; the 337th had lost most of its artillery and was disintegrating, and a forward detachment of 42nd Division, with the rest of 69th Corps following, reached the town at 1700 and made a crossing of the Basia River. The assault continued the next day at 0600 and by midnight 49th Army was approaching the Dniepr bridges at Mogilev and crossings began on the morning of June 26. The next day the 222nd was transferred back to 33rd Army as part of 62nd Corps to reinforce its progress westward.

On June 27 the Army formed mobile columns which brushed aside remnants of 110th Infantry Division and captured Kopys after an advance of up to 40 km. The 222nd forced a crossing of the Dniepr north of Shklow and captured a bridgehead; its immediate objective, with the rest of its Army, was the town of Byerazino on the Berezina River. At this point the only hope for 4th Army was to retreat faster than the Soviet forces could follow. On July 10 the division would be awarded the Order of the Red Banner for its part in the liberation of Mogilev, Shklow and Bykhaw and the crossings of the Pronya and Dniepr. At 1745 hours on June 28 the commander of 4th Army was finally ordered to retreat behind the Berezina as quickly as possible due to the disasters that had unfolded at Orsha and Babruysk but this was far too late and the Army would soon be encircled and destroyed east of Minsk.

=== Pursuit toward Poland ===
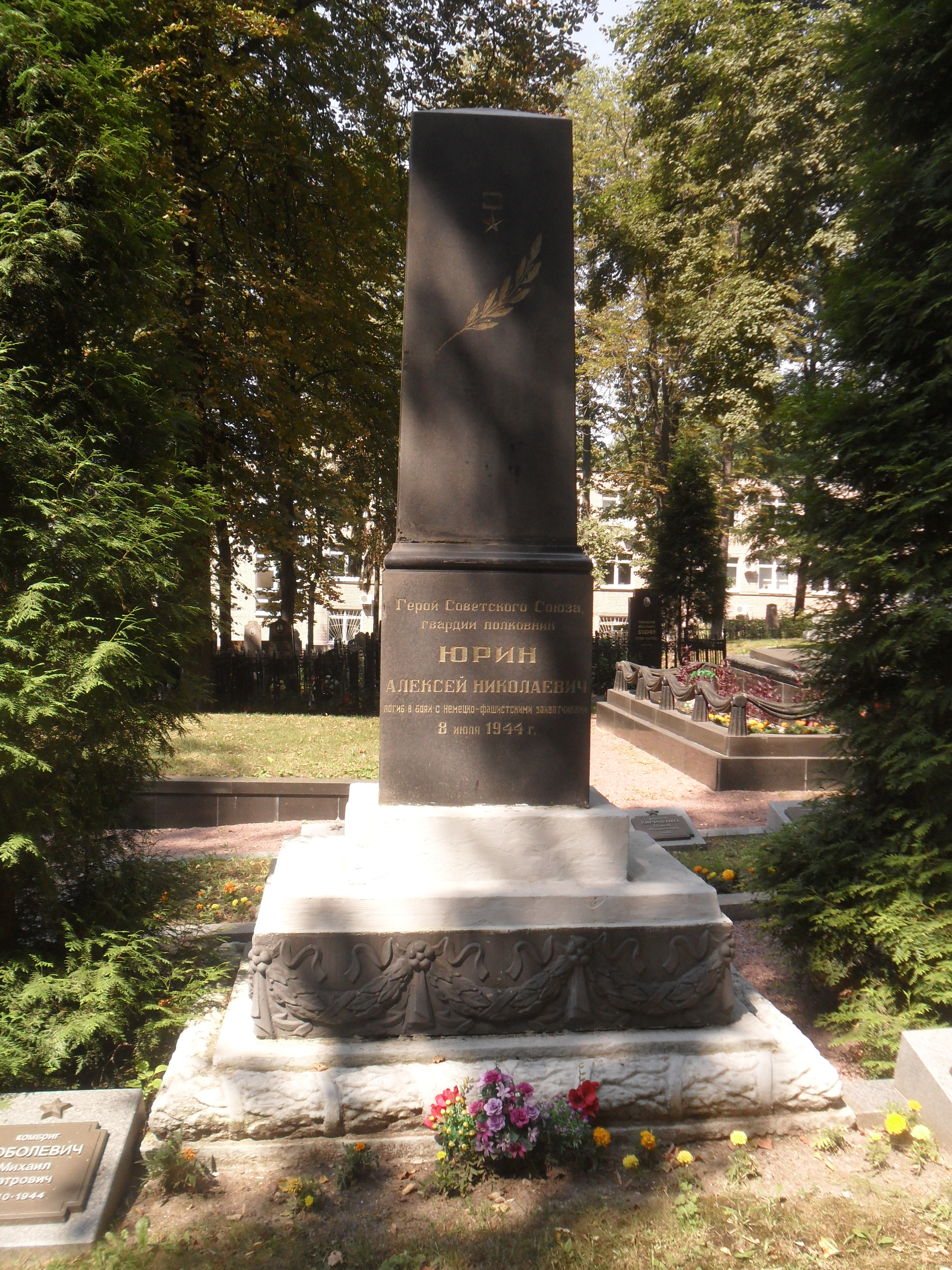
Monument to Col. A. N. Yurin in Minsk

In order to complete the pursuit of the defeated German forces, late on June 28 the STAVKA directed 2nd Belorussian Front to develop a rapid offensive in the direction of Minsk, capture that place, and reach the west bank of the Svislach River no later than July 8, in conjunction with 3rd Belorussian Front. To this end the 222nd formed the basis of 33rd Army's forward detachment, with the 1197th Self-Propelled Artillery Regiment (SU-76s), 873rd Antitank Artillery Regiment, 206th Sapper Battalion, 307th Guards Mortar Regiment, two antiaircraft batteries and a truck battalion. On July 21 Colonel Yurin was rewarded for his leadership of the division in the offensive to date when he was named a Hero of the Soviet Union. Before the medal could officially presented Yurin was killed in action on July 26 while the division was forcing a crossing of the Neman River near the village of Balberishkis, Lithuania. He was buried in Minsk. Yurin was succeeded in command by Col. Grigorii Petrovich Savchuk, who had become a Hero of the Soviet Union in 1943 as a regimental commander in the 181st Rifle Division.

The 757th Rifle Regiment received the honorific "Neman" for its role in the river crossing. By this time the division was under command of the 19th Rifle Corps, and 33rd Army was part of 3rd Belorussian Front. On July 28 the Front received a directive from the STAVKA to advance toward the border of East Prussia no later than August 10. By now the offensive had run well beyond its supply lines and German reserves were arriving. On the morning of August 9, following a powerful artillery and air preparation, German panzer forces, supported by various other units, broke through the defense of the 222nd in stubborn fighting and reached the Marijampolė–Vilkaviškis road, where it ran into artillery fire from the 47th Antitank Artillery Brigade, and then the 2nd Guards Tank Corps' tank ambushes. Despite heavy losses the German force managed to retake Vilkaviškis, but further efforts toward Kaunas were repelled by 2nd Guards Tanks. During the next four days the OKW transferred panzer forces for their upcoming Operation Doppelkopf but on August 15 the 3rd Belorussian Front renewed its offensive in the direction of Gumbinnen with 33rd and 11th Guards Armies. This effort continued until the 22nd and eventually involved elements of 5th Army. While Vilkaviškis was recaptured only part of the latter Army was able to reach the German frontier. By the beginning of September the 222nd had returned to 62nd Corps, joining the 49th and 362nd Rifle Divisions as the only rifle formations in 33rd Army.

== Into Germany ==
During much of September the 33rd Army was in the Reserve of the Supreme High Command before being reassigned to 1st Belorussian Front in October. In preparation for the Vistula-Oder Offensive the Army, now with three corps totalling nine divisions, was deployed on the left (south) flank of the Front, in the Puławy bridgehead over the Vistula. Its shock group was assigned a breakthrough front 6 km wide and was backed by 212 artillery pieces and mortars (76mm or larger calibre) per kilometre. After breaking through the Army's main forces were to attack in the direction of Szydłowiec to link up with 1st Ukrainian Front before proceeding to Tomaszów and Łódź.

In general the offensive was carried out according to this plan and the forces in the Puławy bridgehead broke through the German tactical defense zone on the operation's first day, January 12, 1945. By day's end they had gained up to 30 km. On January 24 the 222nd played a leading role in the liberation of the city of Kalisz and in recognition on February 19 it would be awarded the Order of Suvorov, 2nd Degree. On February 15 the 3rd Guards Army reached the mouth of the Bóbr River, which enabled the 33rd Army to clear German forces from a bridgehead north of Grossen. Two days later Colonel Savchuk left his command; he was made deputy commander of 16th Rifle Corps, and later deputy commander of 29th Guards Rifle Corps for combat units, before participating in the Battle of Berlin as the Corps' representative to the 74th Guards Rifle Division. His replacement was Col. Mikhail Andrianovich Popov, who had just vacated the post Savchuk now filled. On February 14 Col. Aleksandr Yakovlevich Zhidenko had been named deputy commander of the 222nd, and took full command from Popov on April 5. He would lead the division into the postwar and would eventually reach the rank of major general in 1958 before being removed to the Reserve in 1960. On the same date the division was recognized with a battle honor for its penetration of the historic German state of Brandenburg.

=== Berlin Operation ===
At the start of the Berlin offensive on April 16 the 33rd Army was deployed along the east bank of the Oder River from a bridgehead south of Frankfurt-on-Oder and along the east bank of the Neisse River; in all, a 64 km front with nearly all its forces concentrated on a 3 km sector from Zsetznow to Lossow and another 3.5 km sector between Brieskow and Wisenau. The 222nd was in the second echelon of 62nd Corps. 33rd Army began its attack at 0615 hours, following a 30-minute artillery preparation. During the course of the day it advanced 4–6 km through wooded and swampy terrain and broke through all of the first and most of the second German defense lines. By the end of the day the 62nd Corps had reached a line from 1.5 km west of Brieskow to Unter Lindow to Rautenkrantz. On April 17 the offensive was resumed at 1050 hrs, after an artillery preparation of 20 minutes, and the Corps advanced another 2 km, capturing height 71.0 and the eastern slopes of height 74.8. By the end of April 21, 62nd Corps had reached the Oder-Spree Canal. On April 28 the division took part in the capture of Kuschkow (13 km northeast of Lübben) as it continued to advance south of Berlin. It ended its combat path on the banks of the Elbe.

== Postwar ==
When the war ended, the division held the official name of 222nd Rifle, Smolensk-Brandenburg, Order of the Red Banner, Order of Suvorov Division. (Russian: 222-я стрелковая Смоленско-Бранденбургская Краснознамённая ордена Суворова дивизия.) In a final round of awards on June 11 the 757th Rifle Regiment was given the Order of the Red Banner, while the 774th Rifle Regiment received the Order of Suvorov, 3rd Degree and the 666th Artillery Regiment received the Order of Kutuzov, 3rd Degree, all for their part in eliminating German forces southeast of Berlin.

According to STAVKA Order No. 11095 of May 29, 1945, part 6, the 222nd is listed as one of the rifle divisions to be "disbanded in place". It was disbanded in Germany in accordance with the directive during the summer of 1945.
