= 211th Rifle Division =

211th Rifle Division (July 1941 - October 13, 1941) 211th Rifle Division (December 12, 1941 - July 1945)
- Active: 1941–1945
- Country: Soviet Union
- Branch: Red Army
- Type: Infantry
- Size: Division
- Engagements: Operation Barbarossa; Yelnya offensive Operation Typhoon; Voronezh–Kastornoye offensive Oryol Offensive; Battle of Kursk; Battle of the Dniepr; Battle of Kiev (1943); Zhitomir–Berdichev offensive Proskurov-Chernivtsi offensive Lvov–Sandomierz offensive Battle of the Dukla Pass; Western Carpathian offensive Moravia–Ostrava offensive Prague offensive
- Decorations: Order of the Red Banner (2nd formation); Order of Suvorov (2nd formation)
- Battle honours: Chernigov (2nd formation)

Commanders
- Notable commanders: Lt. Col. Matvei Stepanovich Batrakov; Col. Aleksandr Borisovich Barinov; Maj. Gen. Viktor Lvovich Makhlinovskii; Maj. Gen. Nikolai Alekseevich Kichaev; Col. Georgii Sergeevich Tomilovskii; Lt. Col. Ivan Pavlovich Elin

The 211th Rifle Division was an infantry division of the Red Army, originally formed just after the start of the German invasion, based on the shtat (table of organization and equipment) of September 13, 1939. In fact the division remained chronically short of equipment, particularly heavy weapons, throughout the existence of the 1st formation. Assigned to 43rd Army of Reserve Front it first saw combat along the Desna River at the time of the Yelnya offensive and several of its subunits were overtaken by panic when counterattacked by German tanks. During the first day of Operation Typhoon its line was breached and it was soon encircled and destroyed.

A new 211th was formed in January 1942 based on the 429th Rifle Division. It was soon assigned to 48th Army in Bryansk Front and remained on this quiet sector for the rest of the year. In January and February 1943 it took part in the offensives north of Kursk that destroyed part of German 2nd Army and carved out the northern portion of the Kursk salient. Serving in Central Front it played only a small role in the defense of the salient in July and soon began advancing through eastern Ukraine as part of 13th Army, winning a battle honor in the process.

Transferred to 1st Ukrainian Front's 38th Army it saw extensive fighting in the complex battles west of Kiev in November and December and in March 1944 it was awarded the Order of the Red Banner for its part in the liberation of Vinnytsia. During the Lvov–Sandomierz offensive in July and August its four regiments each received distinctions for their roles in this victory. Following this the division moved into the Carpathian Mountains of Czechoslovakia, soon joining the 4th Ukrainian Front and eventually the 1st Guards Army of that Front in the last months of the war and receiving further honors as a result of this difficult fighting. It ended the war near Prague with a very distinguished record but was disbanded within months of the German surrender.

== 1st Formation ==
The division began forming in July 1941 at Zagorsk in the Moscow Military District. When completed it had the following order of battle:

- 887th Rifle Regiment
- 894th Rifle Regiment
- 896th Rifle Regiment
- 829th Artillery Regiment
- 357th Antitank Battalion
- 550th Antiaircraft Battalion
- 376th Reconnaissance Battalion
- 572nd Sapper Battalion
- 725th Signal Battalion
- 292nd Medical/Sanitation Battalion
- 747th Motor Transport Battalion
- 431st Field Bakery
- 327th Field Postal Station

Lt. Col. Matvei Stepanovich Batrakov was appointed to command on August 4, the day the division officially entered service. It was assigned to 43rd Army of Reserve Front on August 10, less than a week after it finished forming; it was nearly at full strength in personnel but suffered considerable shortages of equipment, particularly heavy weapons.

=== Battle of Yelnya ===
During mid-July the 2nd Panzer Group had seized the town of Yelnya and surrounding territory just as it was reaching the limits of its over-extended supply lines, forming a semi-circular salient into Soviet-held territory. During August this was handed over to the XX Army Corps and came under attack by the 24th Army of Reserve Front in mid-month. When this proved unsuccessful it was suspended on August 21 to allow the Army to be reinforced and for additional forces to be brought up, including 43rd Army to the south of the salient.

Once it was deployed the 43rd Army had four rifle divisions (53rd, 149th, 211th and 222nd) and one tank division (109th) on a 48 km-wide front along the Desna River from 18 km southwest of Yelnya to 40 km east of Roslavl. It was facing the three divisions of the German VII Army Corps. Fighting on this sector was complicated by the swampy and marshy western bank of the river.

24th Army began its assault on the salient at 0700 hours on August 30. Simultaneously the shock group of 43rd Army, consisting of the 211th and 149th Rifle and the 109th and 104th Tank Divisions, thrust across the Desna and penetrated the VII Corps' defenses between its 23rd and 197th Infantry Divisions. After an advance of up to 6 km westward the group was halted the following day by two regiments of the 267th Infantry Division which German 4th Army had dispatched hastily forward from its reserve LIII Army Corps. A counterattack by a battlegroup of 10th Panzer Division later in the day caused panic in the ranks of the 211th and forced it and the other attacking Soviet divisions to break off their attack and retreat to the Desna's eastern bank.

Overnight the commander of Reserve Front, Army Gen. G. K. Zhukov, communicated with Stalin's advisor A. N. Poskrebyshev in part:

I just now received the unpleasant news about 211th Division, which was operating toward Roslavl. It, this division, which yielded to panic during the night, retreated 3-6 kilometres, and created an unfavorable situation for another RD – the 149th, because of its flight. In light of the difficult situation, I would like to go down to 211th Division's sector tonight to restore order and take whoever is responsible in hand...

Zhukov was granted permission to delay a trip to Moscow and visited the 43rd Army's front on September 1. Over the following days, under the pressure of 24th Army's attacks, XX Army Corps began a phased withdrawal from the Yelnya salient, which was completed on September 8. During this time Stalin asked Zhukov "...will the illustrious 211th Division 'sleep' for long?" and Zhukov replied:

The 211th is now reforming and will be ready no earlier than 10 September. I will use it as a reserve and not let it 'sleep'. I request you permit me to arrest and condemn all the scaremongers to which you refer.

Stalin permitted him to "judge them with full severity." In the course of the operation the 43rd Army suffered roughly 10,000 casualties, a large number of which were from the 211th.

=== Operation Typhoon ===
Even at the end of September the division was far from fully equipped. Although it had 9,638 personnel on strength they were armed with just 44 light and heavy machine guns, 32 artillery pieces and mortars, four antiaircraft guns and just eight antitank guns. In other words, it was nearly full strength in manpower but had little more firepower than a rifle regiment. The day before the start of the German offensive it still had none of its 82mm mortars and just two 120mm mortars on hand.

As of October 1 the 211th was still in 43rd Army of Reserve Front, along with the 53rd, 149th and 222nd Rifle Divisions. The 53rd was the strongest division and was defending a 24 km-wide sector along the Desna, with the 149th in second echelon and the 211th and 222nd protecting the left flank. At 0615 hours on October 2 a 15-minute artillery preparation began along the Army's entire sector, followed by the actual assault. The 211th was struck by one infantry division and part of another, along with a battalion of tanks. By noon the front had been breached, following which a panzer and a motorized division were committed through the gap toward Spas-Demensk. By the early afternoon of October 10 the Army's headquarters had arrived at Lapshinka and the remnants of some of its divisions were moving through Gzhatsk and Mozhaysk toward Kaluga but German forces now blocked further retreat. The 211th did not get this far; by the end of October 5 it had been encircled near Spas-Demensk and was soon forced to surrender.

The division was considered destroyed by October 13 although it was not officially stricken from the Red Army order of battle until December. Lt. Colonel Batrakov managed to escape the debacle and was not held accountable for the division's failings. He was wounded later in the Battle of Moscow and after recovering was given command of the 42nd Rifle Brigade, which he led in the Battle of Stalingrad. Wounded again in the city fighting he furthered his military education after leaving hospital, rose to the rank of major general and commanded the 59th Rifle Division during the Soviet invasion of Manchuria.

== 2nd Formation ==
A new 211th Rifle Division was designated in January 1942, based on the 429th Rifle Division that had begun forming in the South Ural Military District the previous month. Based on the shtat of July 29, 1941 it took about three months to complete its forming up and when this was complete its order of battle was as follows:

- 887th Rifle Regiment
- 894th Rifle Regiment
- 896th Rifle Regiment
- 829th Artillery Regiment
- 357th Antitank Battalion
- 90th Antiaircraft Battery (until April 25, 1942)
- 376th Reconnaissance Company
- 572nd Sapper Battalion
- 725th Signal Battalion (later 30th Signal Company)
- 292nd Medical/Sanitation Battalion
- 358th Chemical Defense (Anti-gas) Company
- 447th Motor Transport Company
- 428th Field Bakery
- 893rd Divisional Veterinary Hospital
- 1681st Field Postal Station
- 1084th Field Office of the State Bank

Col. Aleksandr Borisovich Barinov, who had been made commander of the 429th on December 12, 1941, remained in command after the redesignation. In March it was moved to the Reserve of the Supreme High Command where it remained until May when it was assigned to the 48th Army in Bryansk Front; it would remain under these commands until January 1943. On June 23 Colonel Barinov was replaced by Col. Viktor Lvovich Makhlinovskii. This officer had previously led the 240th Rifle Division and would be promoted to the rank of major general on February 14, 1943.

=== Voronezh–Kastornoye Offensive ===
During the balance of 1942 the 211th was on a relatively quiet sector as the main German offensives took place toward Stalingrad and the Caucasus. As the German 6th Army faced utter defeat at the former place Bryansk Front went over to the offensive in the direction of Kastornoye. This joint operation with Voronezh Front targeted the German 2nd and Hungarian 2nd Armies. Bryansk Front carried out an extensive regrouping for the operation with 13th Army to be ready to attack on January 26 in conjunction with Voronezh Front's 38th Army; as part of this regrouping the 211th was moved from 48th to 13th Army. This Army was to break through along an 18-km-wide sector between the Kshen and Olym rivers with a shock group of seven rifle divisions. The 211th was in second echelon with the 280th and 81st Rifle Divisions. These three divisions were, upon the arrival of the first echelon divisions in the area Volochik–Nizhne-Bolshoe–Vysshee-Bolshoe, to develop, in conjunction with 148th Rifle Division, the offensive to the west and southwest to create an external encirclement front.

Through January 26 the first echelon of 13th Army broke through the Axis defense and advanced up to 8 km in depth but was unable to develop this success. The next day, while several of those divisions were held up by enemy strongpoints, the second echelon had advanced to the Turchanovo–Zamaraika–Kshen line in readiness to develop the attack to the west. By now the Army had penetrated to a depth of 20 km through a 25 km-wide gap and routed the main forces of the German 82nd Infantry Division, creating an immediate threat to Kastornoye from the north. On January 28, while the first echelon fought for Kastornoye the second echelon divisions began their drive from the Kshen River to the west, facing the 383rd Infantry Division. By day's end they had begun to develop the offensive toward the Tim River, followed by the 148th and 15th Rifle Divisions.

=== Oryol Offensive ===
Late in January Marshal Zhukov had persuaded Stalin to add Kursk to the list of objectives to be seized in the overall Red Army winter counteroffensive. Under orders issued by Zhukov late on January 26 the taking of Kursk was to be another joint operation between Bryansk and Voronezh Fronts. The two fronts would be facing elements of the 2nd Panzer Army and that part of 2nd Army that had escaped the Kastornoye encirclement. The encirclement battle was effectively completed by February 2. On that same date Bryansk Front reported that the 211th had:

... captured Lugovskii, Kazanka 2, Zalese, and Mozhaevka after throwing a mobile detachment forward to cut the Oryol-Kursk railroad in the region north of Zolotukhino...

The following day the division developed its success and captured the western bank of the Polevaya Snova River in the Goriainovo and Bukreevka sector, and by the end of February 5 had reached a line from Nizhnye Smorodnoye to Derlovo; the Front also reported that 13th Army had accounted for 1,000 German soldiers and officers killed or captured the previous day. Given these successes the STAVKA decided on February 6 to shift the axis of advance northwestward toward Oryol with the intention of outflanking and getting into the rear of 2nd Panzer Army.

Kursk was liberated by 60th Army on February 8. The following day the 211th was reported as concentrating in the Molotochi, Khmelevoye and Teploye region. Among other places the 13th Army took Ponyri the same day, but German resistance was beginning to firm up with counterattacks by infantry and tanks on some sectors. The commander of the Front, Col. Gen. M. A. Reyter, ordered the division to move forward from Molotochi and Khmelevoye toward Trosna and Kromy beginning on the morning of February 10. At midnight on February 12 General Reyter reported that the 211th, now part of Group Novoselsky, which also contained the 280th Rifle Division, three ski brigades and the 19th Tank Corps, under direct command of the Front, had captured Chermoshnoye and was continuing to attack toward the north, but that more German reserves were arriving in the region and shortages of supplies were hampering operations.

On February 16 Reyter directed his chief of staff to urge Group Novoselsky forward:

The commander is pointing out that you are still continuing to mark time in place because you are attacking populated points frontally. Bypass the centers of resistance and fulfill your assigned mission.

Novoselsky replied with two situation reports. The second, on February 21, read in part:

If you think that the 16 kilometre-advance by the 280th and 211th Rifle Divisions, with a maximum of 800 rifles against a full-blooded division plus two separate battalions [enemy], and the 50-kilometre advance by the ski battalions along absolutely roadless areas in combat is marking time in place, then I am in a quandary. I understand the mission, and am doing all that I can.

In response, Reyter ordered Novoselsky to mobilize 5,000 local men to clear the roads of snow. Meanwhile, on February 19 forces of Army Group South had begun the offensive that would become known as the Third Battle of Kharkov and before long the forces of Voronezh and Bryansk Fronts were scrambling to hold their gains of the past weeks. By mid-March the entire front had effectively come to a standstill due to the spring rasputitsa.

=== Battle of Kursk ===
Battle of Kursk. Note position of 70th Army.

Later that month 13th Army was moved to Central Front and the 211th was assigned to 28th Rifle Corps along with the 280th and 132nd Rifle Divisions. In April the Corps was reassigned to 70th Army in the same Front. When Operation Zitadelle began the Army was deployed on a 62 km-wide sector on the northwestern side of the salient. The division was in the first echelon with the 280th, 106th and 102nd Divisions. This echelon held a line from north of Teploye through Krasavka to Buzovko to Katomki. During the course of the battle only the right flank of 70th Army was heavily engaged, mostly in the area of Teploye, and this did not involve 28th Corps except in a supporting role.

By July 9 it was clear that the offensive by German 9th Army had stalled, and on July 12 the Red Army launched Operation Kutuzov against the north flank of the Oryol salient it occupied. Central Front now began preparing for its part in this operation. As of the end of July 14. 28th Corps, now consisting of the 211th, 102nd, 106th and 132nd Rifle Divisions, was deployed along a line from Krasavka to Buzovo to Katomki. At 0600 hours on July 15 the Front attacked along its entire front following a 15-minute artillery onslaught. Despite heavy resistance and counterattacks the German line was penetrated up to 3 km. The following day the offensive was renewed and 70th Army was back to its original lines by the 17th.

== Into Ukraine ==
Later in July the 211th returned to 13th Army, still in 28th Corps. By August 1 the 13th and 70th Armies were making a joint advance in the direction of Kromy. Oryol itself fell to forces of Bryansk Front on August 5. On or near August 18 the Soviet forces reached the Hagen position at the base of the former salient. On August 26 Central Front resumed the offensive against Army Group Center, striking at the 9th Army right flank east of Karachev and near 2nd Army's center at Sevsk and east of Klintsy. The thrust at Sevsk scored a deep penetration and the German Army Group committed what reserves it had to a counterattack against it on August 29. This left an opening for 60th Army to make a sudden advance to Yesman, 40 km behind 2nd Army's south flank. The Front commander, Army Gen. K. K. Rokossovskii, now regrouped 13th Army and 2nd Tank Army from his right to his left flank to exploit this success.

Over the following days 2nd Army retreated to the Desna River as Rokossovskii shifted his attention to the left (north) flank of 4th Panzer Army. On September 9 elements of Central Front crossed the Desna south of Novhorod-Siverskyi and at Otsekin and between September 16 and 18 the 7th Guards Mechanized Corps aimed a two-pronged thrust northward across the Desna on either side of Chernigov which collapsed the south flank of 2nd Army. Within days the city was liberated and the division, along with the rest of 28th Corps, was recognized with an honorific:

CHERNIGOV – ...211th Rifle Division (Maj. Gen. Makhlinovskii, Viktor Lvovich)... The troops that participated in the liberation of Chernigov, by order of the Supreme Commander-in-Chief of 21 September 1943 and a commendation in Moscow, are given a salute of 12 artillery salvoes by 120 guns.

The Front now continued its advance toward the Dniepr in the direction of Kiev. In October the 13th Army was moved to Voronezh Front (as of October 20 1st Ukrainian Front) and the division was transferred to 15th Rifle Corps, joining the 8th and 148th Rifle Divisions. During this period the division controlled the 292nd and 572nd Separate Rifle Battalions as an augmentation to its strength. In a report dated October 10 the division was noted as having 7,259 personnel on the rolls, making it the largest in 13th Army, armed with 30 82mm mortars, nine 120mm mortars, six 76mm regimental guns, and the 829th Artillery had 18 76mm cannon plus eight 122mm howitzers. A further report from early November showed that 70 percent of its personnel were from the 1893-1902 year groups, which was quite an elderly cadre.

=== Battle of Kiev ===
At dawn on November 6 troops of 1st Ukrainian Front liberated Kiev. During the three previous days the 13th Army had not been involved in fighting and was doing reconnaissance and improving its positions. Overnight on November 4/5 the 336th Rifle Division of 28th Corps and the 211th were pulled out of the front line, transferred to 60th Army, and began to move south. In the process they linked up with a detachment of 8th Rifle Division that had forced the Pripyat River in early October before being encircled by counterattacks. In a daring move the commander of 151st Rifle Regiment, Col. Georgii Sergeevich Tomilovskii, led the encircled troops in a breakout to the west, joining a partisan detachment near Ovruch. In recognition of his leadership Tomilovskii was made a Hero of the Soviet Union on October 16. He would become the commander of the 211th on April 26, 1944.

During November 6 the forces of 60th Army forced the German grouping on its sector, including the 8th Panzer Division, to withdraw across the Zdvizh River, and also cut the Kiev–Korosten railroad. However, the Army was beginning to face serious shortages of ammunition and fuel. Upon joining the 60th the 211th was assigned to the 17th Guards Rifle Corps, which also contained the 70th Guards Rifle Division. The Front commander, Army Gen. N. F. Vatutin, ordered the offensive to continue into western Ukraine with 60th Army directed to take bridgeheads over the Teteriv River in the area of Radomyshl by the end of November 9. 17th Guards Corps was held in the Army's second echelon.

On November 11 the Army cleared the Teteriv along its entire front, advanced from 10 to 25 km and captured 200 prisoners and large amounts of equipment. During the next day the Corps moved to the south of the Army's main axis and by the day's end had reached 38th Army's sector in the Stavetskaya Sloboda area; by now that Army was approaching Zhytomyr. Throughout the advancing Soviet forces divisional artillery was falling behind, ammunition was in short supply, and 38th Army was starting to face counterattacks from panzer forces. During the evening the STAVKA ordered Vatutin to cease the advance and consolidate the liberated area. As part of this order the 17th Guards Corps was transferred to 38th Army. At this time the 221st was in quite good shape with 7,514 personnel on strength. It would remain under command of this Army until the last few months of the war.

==== Kiev Strategic Defensive Operation ====
During the rest of November the 1st Ukrainian Front was on the defensive, under attack by the 4th Panzer Army. In the morning of November 15 the division was organizing a defense along a line from Zapadnya to Gnilets. This line was incomplete when it was struck by the 1st Panzer and 1st SS Panzer Divisions. In heavy fighting throughout the day against 38th Army the German forces managed to capture Solovyovka and drive the 17th Guards Corps to the north. The next day the two German divisions continued to attempt to break through to Brusyliv but were only able to reach Divin against 70th Guards. Having failed in the direct approach the German divisions began attacking the 211th in the direction of Vodotyi and Vilnya, forcing it to make a fighting withdrawal to the north; by the end of the day German tanks broke into the Vilnya area, creating a threat that they might reach the rear of the 75th Guards and 202nd Rifle Divisions. Despite heavy resistance on November 17 the panzers were able to reach the paved road from Kiev to Zhytomyr, threatening to envelop the Soviet forces there. 38th Army continued to reorganize the following day and the 17th Guards Corps, which now included the 75th Guards Division, was engaged in defensive fighting along a front from Tsarevka to Privorotye to Morozovka. During the next day the 211th joined the 253rd Rifle Division in fighting in the Kocherovo area.

Overnight General Vatutin issued orders to the Army to launch a counteroffensive on November 21. During November 19 the momentum of 4th Panzer Army began to decline, although 17th Guards Corps was forced to abandon Morozovka. After regrouping the panzer forces focused on encircling 38th Army's Brusyliv group of forces and although the town was taken on November 23 and Vatutin's planned counterstroke was suspended the encirclement was not successful. Fighting continued through November 25–29 but both sides were by now effectively played out.

==== Zhitomir–Berdichev and Proskurov-Chernivtsi Offensives ====
Vatutin's counteroffensive finally began on December 24 but initially only involved the 1st Guards and the 1st Tank Armies. It soon expanded to include the 38th Army, which was facing the German XIII Army Corps north of Zhytomyr. By December 30 the 4th Panzer Army's front was breaking apart and a 58 km-wide gap had opened between it and XIII Corps; the following day Zhytomyr was liberated for the second time. On January 4, 1944, that Corps, attempting to hold at and northwest of Berdychiv, reported that it was falling apart, and that city fell a few days later. By the end of the month the lines had stabilized north of Vinnytsia. On January 16 General Makhlinovskii was removed from command of the 211th due to dereliction of duty and transferred to deputy command of the 107th Rifle Division; he was replaced by Maj. Gen. Nikolai Alekseevich Kichaev. Within months Makhlinovskii commanded the 340th Rifle Division but was hospitalized in September. He retired from the Army in 1946 due to ill health and died in 1950.

The offensive was renewed on March 4. During February the division had been reassigned to 101st Rifle Corps with the 70th Guards and 241st Rifle Divisions. 38th Army was on the left (south) flank of the Front and its initial objective was Vinnytsia, after which it was to continued to advance southwest toward Zhmerynka, which had been designated as a Festung (fortress) by Hitler. The former was liberated on March 20 and three days later the 211th was recognized for its role with the award of the Order of the Red Banner. On March 28 General Kichaev was seriously wounded and hospitalized. He never held another command at the front and died at Leningrad in October 1972. He was replaced by Col. Grigorii Matveevich Kochenov, but this officer was in turn replaced on April 26 by Colonel Tomilovskii. Two months later he left the 211th and returned to the 8th Rifle Division as deputy commander, being replaced by Lt. Col. Ivan Pavlovich Elin. On September 29 Tomilovskii again took over the division and led it until it was disbanded.

=== Lvov–Sandomierz Offensive ===
In the planning for the Lvov-Sandomierz operation in July the 38th Army was to penetrate the German defense in the Bzovitsa and Bogdanovka sector on a width of 6 km. It would then develop the offensive with seven divisions in the direction of Peremyshliany with the objective of encircling the German Lvov grouping in cooperation with the 4th Tank and 60th Armies.

The offensive began on July 13 and went largely according to this plan; Lvov was liberated on July 27 and three days later the 101st Rifle Corps reached a line from Przemyśl to Dobromyl before forcing the San River south of Dynów and capturing the town of Sanok. One of the 211th's rifle regiments was awarded a battle honor:

LVOV... 894th Rifle Regiment (Major Fyodorchenko, Yakov Semyonovich)... The troops who participated in the liberation of Lvov, by the order of the Supreme High Command of 27 July 1944, and a commendation in Moscow, are given a salute of 20 artillery salvoes from 224 guns.

On August 10 the 887th and 896th Rifle Regiments would also be rewarded for their roles in the Lvov battles with the Order of the Red Banner, while the 829th Artillery Regiment received the Order of Bogdan Khmelnitsky, 2nd Degree.

== Into the Carpathians ==
In September and October the division took part in the East Carpathian Offensive, particularly in the area of the Dukla Pass. During September it was transferred to the 67th Rifle Corps and then to the 76th Rifle Corps in October but returned to the 101st Corps in November when 38th Army was itself transferred to 4th Ukrainian Front. The 211th would remain in this Front for the duration of the war.

Fighting died down until the start of the Western Carpathian Offensive on January 12, 1945. By now the 211th had returned to 67th Corps; it would remain under this command for the duration. 38th Army attacked following a heavy artillery preparation with the 101st and 67th Corps and by January 15 had broken through the XI SS Army Corps and began advancing westward. Four days later the 887th Regiment was awarded an honorific:

GORLICE... 887th Rifle Regiment (Lt. Colonel Protsenko, Averyan Nikiforovich)... The troops who participated in the capture of Jasło and Gorlice, by the order of the Supreme High Command of 19 January 1945, and a commendation in Moscow, are given a salute of 20 artillery salvoes from 224 guns.

In addition, on February 19 the 894th Regiment would be decorated with the Order of Bogdan Khmelnitsky, 2nd Degree while the 896th Regiment would receive the Order of Suvorov, 3rd Degree.

During March the division was transferred along with 67th Corps to 1st Guards Army for the duration. The Moravia–Ostrava Offensive began on March 10 and during the course of the operation the 211th was rewarded for its part in the capture of Bielsko with the Order of Suvorov, 2nd Degree, on April 5. The division ended the war near Prague. Its full title at this time was 211th Rifle, Chernigov, Order of the Red Banner, Order of Suvorov Division. (Russian: 211-я стрелковая Черниговская Краснознамённая ордена Суворова дивизия.)

== Postwar ==
In a final presentation of awards on June 4 the 894th Rifle Regiment received the Order of the Red Banner while the 887th Rifle Regiment was presented with the Order of Kutuzov, 3rd Degree, both for their parts in the liberation of Bohumín and nearby towns.

According to STAVKA Order No. 11097 of May 29, 1945, parts 5 and 8, the 211th is listed as one of the rifle divisions to be transferred to 2nd Belorussian Front (soon redesignated as the Northern Group of Forces) in the Częstochowa area by June 20 before being "disbanded in place". It was finally disbanded in August.
