= 149th Rifle Division =

149th Rifle Division (September 1939 – December 27, 1941) 149th Rifle Division (January 2, 1942 - July 1945)
- Active: 1939–1945
- Country: Soviet Union
- Branch: Red Army
- Type: Infantry
- Size: Division
- Engagements: Operation Barbarossa; Yelnya offensive Operation Typhoon; Battles of Rzhev; Battle of Kursk; Gomel-Rechitsa offensive Chernigov-Pripyat operation Zhitomir–Berdichev offensive Lvov-Sandomierz Offensive; Vistula–Oder offensive Lower Silesian offensive Battle of Berlin; Battle of Halbe; Prague offensive
- Decorations: Order of the Red Banner; Order of Suvorov; Order of Kutuzov (all 2nd Formation)
- Battle honours: Novograd-Volynskii (2nd Formation)

Commanders
- Notable commanders: Maj. Gen. Fyodor Dmitrievich Zakharov; Col. Ivan Fyodorovich Fedyunkin; Col. Nikolai Lvovich Volkov; Maj. Gen. Andrei Arkhipovich Orlov

The 149th Rifle Division was originally formed as an infantry division of the Red Army by September 1939 in the Oryol Military District, based on the shtat (table of organization and equipment) of later that month. At the outbreak of the war it was still in this District, attempting to build up to wartime strength as part of the 30th Rifle Corps, but by the beginning of July it had been assigned to 28th Army, soon being made part of a shock group known as Group Kachalov. Beginning in the third week of July this Group, under Western Front, started a combined arms drive to the north from the Roslavl area toward Smolensk. This push made very poor progress in a week of fighting before the Group was struck on the left flank by the XXIV Panzer Corps and quickly encircled. The men of the 149th were forced to break out as individuals and small groups, taking heavy losses in the process, and were then moved to the rear of Reserve Front for rebuilding under 43rd Army for most of August. It played an abortive role in the fighting near Yelnya in the last days of the month, costing further casualties, before being pulled back into its Army's second echelon. At the start of the final German offensive on Moscow the 149th found itself almost directly in the path of 4th Panzer Group and was quickly driven north in disarray, becoming encircled with most of its Front by October 7. Although the command staff, other small groups, and individuals managed to escape through the German lines over the coming weeks there was not enough to warrant another rebuilding, and the division was written off in late December.

A new 149th was formed very soon after, based on a 400-series division, in the Moscow Military District, and after only about six weeks of equipping and training was assigned to 61st Army on the south flank of Western Front. Through most of 1942 it took part in minor operations as part of the fighting for the Rzhev salient, but it February 1943 it was transferred to 65th Army of the re-formed Central Front. With this force it began an abortive offensive toward Smolensk and Gomel late in the month, then went over to the defense to prepare for the German summer offensive. 65th Army saw little or no combat in the Kursk offensive, and in late August began advancing through eastern Ukraine toward the Dniepr River. In the campaign to retake Gomel and Rechytsa in mid-October the division forced a crossing of the river and some 20 men were made Heroes of the Soviet Union. This was followed by a successful advance to the north and west which retook both cities, but in December it was transferred south to 1st Ukrainian Front, joining 13th Army as it renewed its advance west of Kyiv, and was soon awarded both a battle honor and the Order of the Red Banner. In April 1944 it was reassigned to 3rd Guards Army of the same Front, where it would remain for the duration of the war. After a few months outside Brody the 149th took part in the Lvov-Sandomierz offensive in July and on the last day of the month forced a crossing of the Vistula River near the latter place and received the Order of Kutuzov. During the Vistula-Oder operation it advanced from the Sandomierz bridgehead through southern Poland and into Silesia, where it took part in fighting through February, arriving at the Neisse River in the third week of the month. During this operation it was also awarded the Order of Suvorov. From this line it attacked into the German heartland in April, first taking part in routing the German Cottbus grouping, and then the encirclement battle against the 9th Army in the Spree Forest. When the German surrender came it was advancing with its Front toward Prague. As with many other distinguished divisions it was disbanded a few months later.

== 1st Formation ==
The 149th began forming in or before September 1939 at Ostrogozhsk in the Oryol Military District, based on the 57th Rifle Regiment of the 19th Rifle Division. It was considered a "sister" unit to the 145th Rifle Division. From the time it formed it was under command of Col. Aleksandr Nikolaevich Nechaev, but he was moved to the 113th Rifle Division, which he led through the Winter War with Finland. He would rise to the rank of lieutenant general by September 1943. On June 11, 1940, Maj. Gen. Fyodor Dmitrievich Zakharov took over the 149th. This officer had previously commanded the 25th Cavalry Division and most recently served as assistant commander of 4th Cavalry Corps. At the start of the German invasion it was still in the Oryol District, assigned to 30th Rifle Corps, which also contained the 19th and 217th Rifle Divisions. Its order of battle was as follows:

- 479th Rifle Regiment
- 568th Rifle Regiment
- 744th Rifle Regiment
- 314th Artillery Regiment
- 426th Howitzer Artillery Regiment
- 271st Antitank Battalion
- 172nd Antiaircraft Battalion
- 130th Reconnaissance Company
- 233rd Sapper Battalion
- 149th Signal Battalion
- 222nd Medical/Sanitation Battalion
- 218th Chemical Defense (Anti-gas) Company
- 101st Motor Transport Battalion
- 215th Field Bakery
- 257th Field Postal Station
- 279th Field Office of the State Bank

General Zakharov would remain in command for the duration of the first formation. At the end of June the division moved with its Corps to the Moscow Military District, where it was assigned to 28th Army, which was one of the separate armies of the STAVKA Reserve. This Army was under command of Lt. Gen. V. Ya. Kachalov.

== Battle for Roslavl ==
By July 10 the composition of 30th Corps had changed to the 149th, 89th and 120th Rifle Divisions, but later in the month, when the Army was incorporated into Western Front, most of its divisions were reassigned and it was being referred to as Group Kachalov. The Group consisted of the 149th and 145th Divisions plus the 104th Tank Division on July 21 as Army Group Center was trying to eliminate the Soviet forces that were partly encircled near Smolensk. The Group was ordered to "concentrate in the Krapivenskii, Vezhniki and Roslavl' region [110km south-southeast of Smolensk] by day's end" before attacking toward the city in the morning.

Marshal S. K. Timoshenko was in command of the Western Direction (the Fronts facing Army Group Center) and was charged by the STAVKA with counterattacking, especially to rescue the 16th and 20th Armies that were pocketed near Smolensk. German forces had already reached Yelnya, and Group Kachalov was ordered to protect its flank in that direction while advancing toward Pochinok as its intermediate objective. The 149th was supported by the 320th Gun Artillery Regiment and one battalion of the 488th Cannon Artillery Regiment, and Zakharov was ordered to capture a line from Chernavka to Likhnovo, 25km southeast of Pochinok, at dawn on July 23 before taking crossings over the Khmara River and pushing on to the objective. The 145th would advance on his left and was expected to cross the Khmara on the Roslavl–Smolensk road. 104th Tanks was to conduct combined operations with both rifle divisions to seize Pochinok.

The counterattack developed in a staggered fashion on a 226km-wide front from Roslavl through Yartsevo to Bely in the north; coordination was impossible over such distances and many of Timoshenko's forces were not fully assembled. Group Kachalov struck the defenses of 18th Panzer Division. This division had lost a great deal of equipment over the preceding month but was quite capable of holding ground. Western Front reported at 20:00 hours that:

Group Kachalov - dislodged enemy forward units by 1700 hours on 23 July and [is] now fighting for crossings over the Stomet' River, 18 kilometres southeast of Pochinok, but under constant attack by enemy aircraft.

Kachalov's headquarters was located at Stodolishche. The general was distraught over the failure of his force to accomplish much of anything and directed his chief of staff, Maj. Gen. P. G. Yegorov, to issue a scathing order to his forces criticizing their performance. Acknowledging the crossing of the Stomet, the order pointed out that the German forces had been able to withdraw, which was put down to an "inadequate tempo of advance" and reliance on frontal attacks, poor artillery support, and lack of reconnaissance. Kachalov ordered that these deficiencies be eliminated and that the two rifle divisions return to the attack at 04:00 the next day to fulfill the original mission. These sorts of problems, stemming from lack of training and experience, could not be solved overnight, and Group Kachalov again only scored local successes, largely by the 145th. At 23:00 hours on July 24 Zakharov came under a scathing critique for failing "to organize for combat" and keeping his artillery support at maximum range, unable to cooperate with the riflemen. The 149th, in consequence, had not only failed to advance but had lost some ground taken the day before. Kachalov then threatened:

The Military Council takes notice of and demands that commanders, commissars, and political workers directly control the fighting, be in their companies and battalions, and, in particular, when necessary, compel their units to fulfill their assigned mission by personal example.

104th Tanks was ordered to provide five T-34s "under a decisive commander" to the division near Lysovka by 0500 on July 25. Both divisions were to replace losses in the rifle companies with "detained stragglers" and rear-area personnel.

The attack continued toward Pochinok with the 149th facing the stiffest resistance. It reached Nikulino and Osinovka, which were 20km south-southeast of the town, while the 145th got to within 10km. At 01:00 hours on July 26 an exasperated Kachalov continued to press his forces to take the crossings over the Khmara. Zakharov, now with four T-34s, was to reach the river on the Ponizovka and railroad line sector some 10km north of its start line by the end of the day. By 2100 he reported to Timoshenko that the 149th had reached a line from Chernavka to Voroshilovo to Lyndovka after minimal gains. Effectively admitting that his attack was stalled his orders for July 27 called for his Group to tie down the German forces near Osinovka and Barsukovskie Farm and continue to press to the Khmara. Zakharov was to keep one regiment in second echelon while destroying the German forces near Voroshilovo. He was also reminded to use secure communications. As his overall counteroffensive wound down Timoshenko excused the failure of Group Kachalov to the arrival of German reinforcements, and emphasized that Yelnya had to be retaken.

At 20:30 hours on July 27 Kachalov ordered his attack to continue the next day, but essentially with the same goals. Zakharov was told to prevent the defenders from digging in along intermediate lines. A composite regiment was to be released by the 222nd Rifle Division at Roslavl to reinforce the Group. Kachalov's force gained some 5km as German forces, now largely of the 263rd Infantry Division, fell back to more defensible lines. In fresh criticism he wrote:

It is intolerable that the forces of the group of 28th Army have been delayed for far too long while trying to overcome individual centers of resistance and firing points...
The units have marked time in place for four days and sometimes have been stopped in front of groups of motorcyclists or separate antitank guns.
I demand all commanders, political workers, and soldiers seize crossings over the Khmara River at all cost tomorrow on 29 July.

He then issued orders virtually identical to those previous. The 149th and 104th Tanks were to combine forces while keeping one regiment behind to exploit any breakthrough. This was followed by more remedial tactical advice from General Yegorov. All of this was for naught as the offensive was effectively suspended.

=== Guderian's counterattack ===
2nd Panzer Group, and its commander, Gen. H. Guderian, had been watching events and looking for an opening. In the morning of August 1 the 3rd and 4th Panzer Divisions began a counterattack aimed at Roslavl with the intention of linking up with IX Army Corps attacking south from Pochinok. Late that day Timoshenko was still chiding Kachalov for his failure and demanding the drive on Pochinok continue, unaware of the danger approaching. The panzers immediately penetrated between the 8th and 148th Rifle Divisions of 13th Army on Kachalov's left flank, then turned east along the Roslavl road, with the 3rd taking up blocking positions on the road from that place to Krychaw, and the 4th moving straight on Roslavl. The left flank of the 222nd Division was turned, and IX Corps struck southward, threatening both flanks of Group Kachalov with envelopment.

Kachalov belatedly became aware of his predicament, and ordered several basic protective measures. He reported that "about 100 tanks and motorized infantry" had already pushed through to Zvenchatka on the Roslavl highway by 17:10 hours, and ordered the 149th to "reconnoiter and withdraw one regiment into second echelon." Further instructions followed for commanders down to company level for antitank defense. These produced few useful results as the offensive developed at high speed on August 2, and by nightfall 4th Panzer was just 15km west of Roslavl, preparing to enter the city the next day. The 197th Infantry Division pushed the Group's left wing east toward the Pochinok–Roslavl road while also cutting the Roslavl–Smolensk road behind Kachalov's headquarters. Farther east, the 137th and 292nd Infantry Divisions pushed south halfway between the Desna River and the Roslavl–Smolensk road, which threatened to put the entire Group in a long pocket near Stodolishche. Kachalov now appreciated the threat to his right wing (the 149th and 104th Tanks) and began a regrouping in the evening, but in fear of judgement by higher headquarters he continued to insist on advancing to the north:

149th RD - after relief by 145th RD, concentrate in the Postarok, Nikulino, and Voroshilovo region [7-10km north-northeast of Stodolishche] attack northward [at] 0500 hours on 3 August to capture crossings over the Khmara River at Egorovka and, subsequently, advance toward Pochinok while protecting the army's right flank.

Such orders at this point were effectively suicidal. Meanwhile, due to sporadic communications Timoshenko was unable to inform the STAVKA of the full extent of the unfolding disaster. He reported that the division had been fighting along a line from Zimnitsy to Starino to Smychkovo, 5km north to 5km northeast of Stodolishche, at 13:00.

With the fall of Roslavl and the blocking of the Moscow highway most of Group Kachalov was encircled. The 292nd Infantry, under Guderian's personal command, linked up with 4th Panzer just east of the village of Kosaki, 17km northeast of the city. As many of his rear area soldiers surrendered, Kachalov and his staff made desperate efforts to identify possible escape routes and organize shock groups to lead the breakout. Higher headquarters finally became aware of the true situation, if in vague terms, at 17:30 hours. At 20:30 the chief of the General Staff, Marshal B. M. Shaposhnikov, ordered Group Kachalov and the rest of 28th Army reassigned to Reserve Front, which was currently under command of Army Gen. G. K. Zhukov, effective 0600 on August 4. Zhukov immediately acted to rescue the Group as well as rebuild his defenses in the region. 43rd Army was to reinforce its line along the Desna with the fresh 258th Rifle Division while 24th Army was ordered to increase pressure on the German Yelnya grouping to deflect attention from Kachalov. At 05:10 he sent precise instructions for the withdrawal to Kachalov. The left wing and center of the Group was to pull back to the Faddeeva Buda and Ostrik River line to link up with the 222nd. With Kachalov himself encircled, Lt. Gen. I. G. Zakharkin was ordered to take direction of the withdrawal from outside the pocket.

During the day both Kachalov and Yegorov were killed in action by German artillery fire near the village of Starinka as they tried to escape the encirclement. Maj. Gen. F. A. Zuev, Kachalov's deputy chief of staff, took command and ordered the remnants of the Group to withdraw at 18:30 hours, while still maintaining the fiction that this was a preliminary to renewing the offensive. In fact, two sub-groupings were formed to break out to the east and southeast overnight. Zakharkin was ordered by Zhukov to "restore order to the remnants of Group Kachalov and place them in second echelon behind 53rd RD and assemble the remnants of 104th TD... [east of the Desna]." At 00:28 on August 7 the Reserve Front headquarters issued a final report to Shaposhnikov on the fate of Group Kachalov based on the statements of survivors. Regarding the 149th it read:

Before the encirclement the... 149th RD [occupied] Rudnia, Berezhok, and Panasovka [27km southeast of Pochinok]...
By the evening of 2 August the enemy pushed 104th TD's right wing back and strengthened its activity on 149th RD's front... At day's end... the commander [Kachalov] decided to withdraw, and, as a result, 149th RD was to withdraw [southeast] through Bogovka, Piataia, Eliseevskie, and Samodidino and further to the east...
The forces began fulfilling the order to withdraw at 2000 hours on 2 August. The first encounter with the enemy during the withdrawal occurred at 0300-0400 hours on 3 August near the village of Starinka, where fierce fighting continued through 1700-1800 hours... After bringing motorized units forward, the enemy exerted heavy pressure on 149th RD, pushing it back to Kovrigin Kholm and occupying the line of the hill west of Starinka to the forest 1 kilometre southeast of Dubovka, while creating a threat in the direction of Dubovka.
Kachalov remained in the village of Starinka to restore order, while 145th and 149th RDs' forces moved [southeast] trying to punch through toward Ermolino [3km southeast]... Group Kachalov escaped in broken up separate groups. Measures are being taken to search for the remaining units...

From German records it appears that after completing the encirclement on August 4 the pocket was effectively liquidated within 48 hours. General Zakharov and sufficient staff and cadre managed to escape that the division was not disbanded, but instead was assigned to 43rd Army, in Reserve Front, on August 10, and the STAVKA attempted to rebuild it to the July 1941 shtat over the coming weeks, incorporating the survivors of its "sister" 145th on August 28.

=== Yelnya Offensive ===
By this time the XX Army Corps was holding the very exposed salient around Yelnya, enveloped on three sides by 24th Army. 43rd Army, under command of Maj. Gen. P. P. Sobennikov, was located to the south facing VII Army Corps on a front of 48km with 53rd, 222nd, 149th, and 211th Rifle Divisions and 104th Tanks, which would soon be converted into the 145th Tank Brigade. Fighting on this sector was complicated by the swampy and marshy western bank of the Desna.

24th Army began its assault on the salient at 07:00 hours on August 30. Simultaneously the shock group of 43rd Army, consisting of the 149th and 211th Rifle, the 104th, and newly-arrived 109th Tank Division, thrust across the Desna and penetrated the VII Corps' defenses between its 23rd and 197th Infantry Divisions. After an advance of up to 6km westward the group was halted the following day by two regiments of the 267th Infantry Division which German 4th Army had dispatched hastily forward from its reserve LIII Army Corps. A counterattack by a battlegroup of 10th Panzer Division later in the day caused panic in the ranks of the 211th and forced it and the other attacking Soviet divisions to break off their attack and retreat back to the Desna's eastern bank.

Overnight, General Zhukov communicated with Stalin's advisor A. N. Poskrebyshev in part:

I just now received the unpleasant news about 211th Division, which was operating toward Roslavl. It, this division, which yielded to panic during the night, retreated 3-6 kilometres, and created an unfavorable situation for another RD – the 149th, because of its flight. In light of the difficult situation, I would like to go down to 211th Division's sector tonight to restore order and take whoever is responsible in hand...

Zhukov was granted permission to delay a trip to Moscow and visited the 43rd Army's front on September 1. Over the following days, under the pressure of 24th Army's attacks, XX Corps began a phased withdrawal from the Yelnya salient. Early in the morning of September 4 Zhukov proposed to Stalin an attack by the 149th and the two tank divisions in an effort to get behind the withdrawal, before advancing with a larger force toward Pochinok and Roslavl. This would be preceded by a regrouping up to September 7 before the attack the next day. In the event the withdrawal was carried out in textbook fashion without offering any openings, although the victory at Yelnya provided a needed boost to Soviet morale.

== Operation Typhoon ==
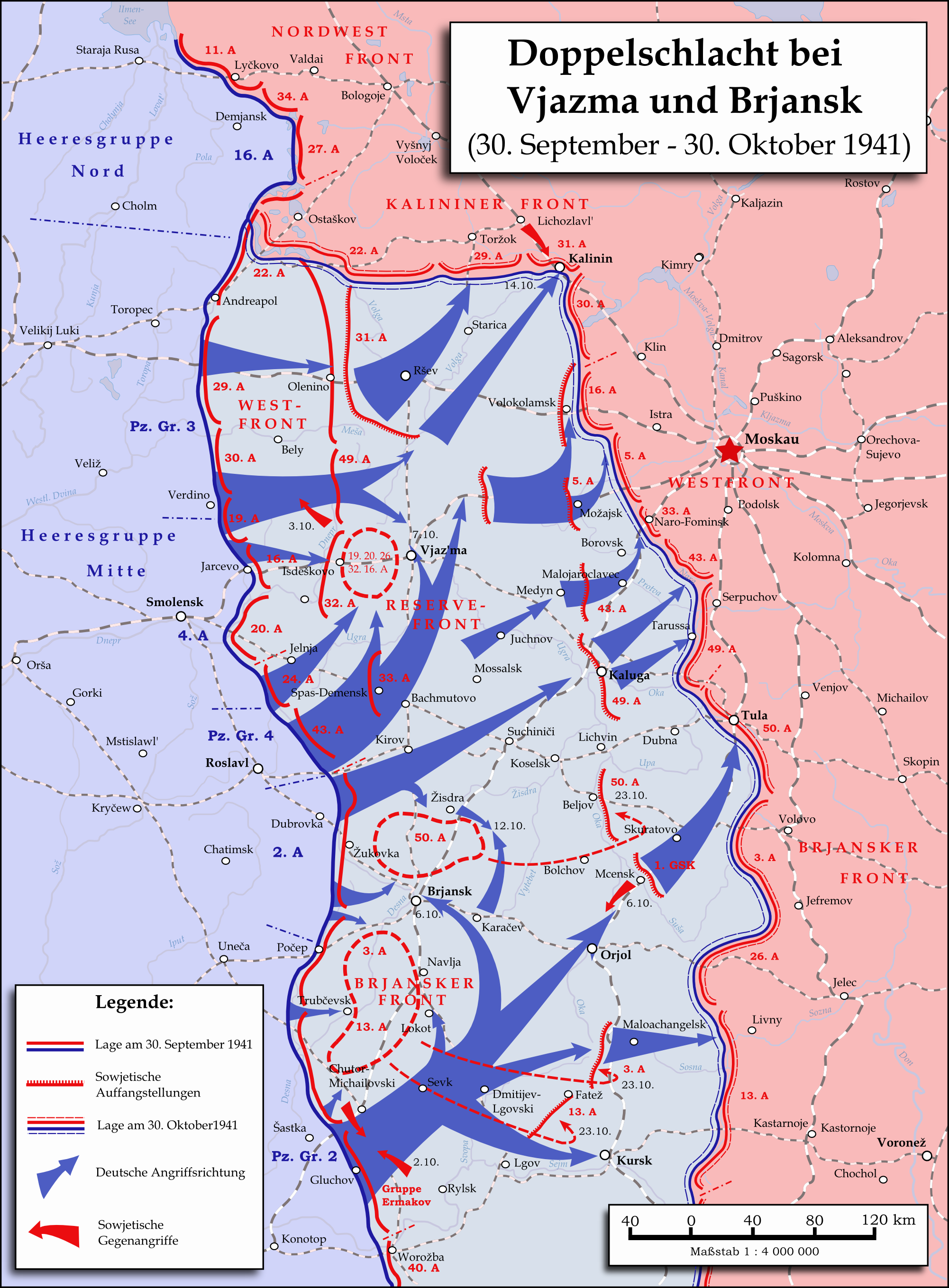
Operation Typhoon. Note positions of 43rd Army.

The 149th remained in poor shape for weapons; in a report to 43rd Army on September 28 Zakharov's staff stated they had only 46 of an authorized 163 light machine guns, 16 out of 108 heavy machine guns, five of 81 50mm mortars, 10 of 54 82mm mortars and just a single 120mm, and no 76mm regimental guns or cannons at all.

These shortages were made more grave by the fact that Army Group Center was clearly massing for a new offensive on Moscow. 2nd Panzer Group in the south kicked this off on September 30. The next day, Reserve Front's radio monitors discovered a new German station on the Roslavl area serving a formation no smaller than a corps. General Sobennikov had placed most of the strength he had on his left flank, expecting the main thrust to come along the Roslavl–Kirov highway. This 24km-wide sector along the Desna was held by the 53rd Division, his strongest. The 149th had been moved from its former line along the Shiutsa River to form a second echelon behind the 53rd, which had built an antitank region 4-6km behind the front line equipped with four guns and two antiaircraft batteries. However, two more regions that had been planned were unequipped. The 113th Rifle Division held the 149th's former sector. Very early on October 2, three deserters of Czech nationality came into the Army's lines with information that the offensive would begin within hours.

At 08:50 hours that morning the Reserve Front headquarters reported to the STAVKA:

... at 0615 the enemy opened a hurricane of artillery and mortar fire on the entire front of 43rd Army and at 0630 went on the attack with up to a battalion in the Novosel'tsy area and up to a battalion in the center. Serebniaka has been taken.

As more information arrived, it was learned that a German infantry division had attacked the sector of the 222nd Division, and another division and a half, supported by a tank battalion, had struck the 211th. The 53rd faced two infantry divisions and two tank battalions, south of the highway. As early as noon the defenses had been breached by infantry with air and armor support while a panzer and motorized division were being committed to develop the offensive in the direction of Spas-Demensk. This was the vanguard of 4th Panzer Group, which was exploiting the boundary between Reserve and Bryansk Fronts. In total, 17 German divisions faced just five of the Red Army. 53rd Division was soon forced to withdraw to a wood northwest of Zhilino. By 14:30 hours a group of up to 100 armored vehicles had made a clean break through the defense before driving to the northeast and during the next three hours a sub-group of 40 reached as far as Osipovka-1 and Zabudskaya. Sobennikov now chose to screen his front with one regiment of the 149th while its main body, along with the 149th Tank Brigade, would attempt to stop the force attacking along the highway. This would be supported by the 144th Tank Brigade coming up from reserve. This effort was broken up, largely by air attacks, as stated in one report:

Enemy aviation in the number of 45 aircraft from 1400 to 1700 repeatedly attacked the 149th Rifle Division and prevented it from moving out to carry out its assignments.

Marshal S. M. Budyonny, now commanding Reserve Front, proposed a counterattack by forces of 32nd Army, as well as the 149th, to restore the situation in 2-3 days, but his report makes it clear he had no idea of the true situation. By day's end 4th Panzer Group had advanced 40km and was in battle with units of 33rd Army, the Front's second echelon formation. On October 3 Budyonny finally realized that a major German offensive was being mounted along the entire front of 43rd Army, but especially against 53rd Division and the neighboring 217th Rifle Division of Bryansk Front. At 16:00 hours, in the face of unauthorized withdrawals of all of the Army's divisions, he was forced to order the occupation of a new line along the Shuitsa and Snopot Rivers, 35-40km behind the former front. During the day the 43rd continued to be pushed to the northeast and east, and by dusk up to 100 panzers had reached the Snopot between Kuzminichi and Yamnoe. Exploiting a gap in 33rd Army's line a mobile group had got into the 43rd's rear. Despite this, Budyonny had no better answer than for the Army to defend along the Snopot. The next day at 14:20 he reported to the STAVKA that:

[Sobennikov], despite an order of the Front commander to defend the Snopot' River, issued an order for the retreat of the 53rd Rifle Division in the direction of Nikolskoe and further on toward Spas-Demensk, and of the 149th and 113th Rifle Divisions and the 148th Tank Brigade to the area of Novo-Aleksandrovskoye, where they were to take up a defense.

Radio and telephone communications with 43rd Army had been lost so at 04:00 on October 4 Budyonny sent his deputy, Lt. Gen. Bogdanov, to "restore order" in the Army and take over command if necessary. Unknown to Budyonny, on the morning of October 3 the 17th Rifle Division had been holding a thin line along the Snopot when the badly battered 149th, 113th, and 53rd passed through its positions. Soon after the 17th was subjected to heavy air and armor attacks which penetrated its left flank before taking Kovalevo and Latyshi. By dawn on October 5 the 149th reached Naro-Fominsk. Budyonny issued new orders at 05:55 hours on October 6 instructing 43rd Army to "occupy and firmly defend the line Gorodechnia–Buda–Kliuchi–Glagol'nia–Mosal'sk–Serpeisk–Lomakino." This line had already been taken by German forces in several places. The condition of the Army can be determined from a message from Kombrig Liubarsky on October 7 to Reserve Front's deputy chief of staff, which stated in part:

The divisions no longer exist as combat units, and there are small groups of infantry soldiers, specialized elements and artillery who have become demoralized by enemy aviation.
The commander of the 149th Rifle Division Zakharov has only one combat engineer battalion. [Apart from this] there has been no information on the situation of the 113th and 149th Rifle Divisions.

On the same day the main German encirclement was closed near Vyazma.

The scattered units and men of 43rd Army, or those who were still under command, were expected to fall back to the Gzhatsk area, but this place fell on October 9. In an example of the chaos reigning, four regimental guns of the 744th Rifle Regiment, plus a truckload of shells, were detained by an officer of the political department of Western Front and officers of the Gzhatsk garrison and ordered to take up firing positions. While moving there, 43rd Army's chief of staff of artillery intercepted them and ordered them to the rear on the basis that they did not belong to Western Front, despite the pleas of the political officer. Every effort was now being made to withdraw from the encirclement. 43rd Army had been directed to move toward Pletnevka, 10km west of Kaluga, but this route was blocked. Sobennikov's headquarters arrived in Lapshinka, 24km south of Naro-Fominsk, at 13:00 hours on October 10, but without its signals department, which was still en route to Pletnevka. Orders were dispatched by courier to the Army's units to pull back from the route to Kaluga, and assembly areas were designated for the four rifle divisions and two tank brigades. By now the 43rd had no base of supply and had completely run out of food and fuel.

In an operational summary of the OKH on October 18, the 149th is listed as one of the divisions destroyed by 2nd Army, although such lists were not always accurate. Individuals and small groups continued to emerge from the encirclement over the coming weeks, and the division officially remained on the books until it was finally written off on December 27. General Zakharov survived and was given command of the 133rd Rifle Division on December 12, and after several other assignments was appointed to lead the 81st Rifle Corps from June 1944 into the postwar, being promoted to the rank of lieutenant general in November of that year. He would retire in August 1948 and died on February 11, 1969.

== 2nd Formation ==
The 427th Rifle Division began forming in early January 1942, at Ryazan in the Moscow Military District, but was very quickly redesignated as the new 149th. Its order of battle was very similar to that of the first formation:

- 479th Rifle Regiment
- 568th Rifle Regiment
- 744th Rifle Regiment
- 314th Artillery Regiment
- 271st Antitank Battalion
- 130th Reconnaissance Company
- 233rd Sapper Battalion
- 149th Signal Battalion (later 28th Signal Company)
- 226th Medical/Sanitation Battalion
- 510th Chemical Defense (Anti-gas) Company
- 106th Motor Transport Company
- 526th Field Bakery
- 891st Divisional Veterinary Hospital
- 1720th Field Postal Station
- 1082nd Field Office of the State Bank (later 1083rd)

Col. Ivan Fyodorovich Fedyunkin took command of the division when it was redesignated. This officer had previously served as the chief of staff of the 3rd and the 78th Rifle Divisions. In early February it was assigned to 61st Army of Western Front and joined the fighting from on February 15.

=== Rzhev-Vyazma Offensive ===
The Soviet winter counteroffensive was in its last throes when the 149th arrived. On March 5 Yukhnov was liberated, but 33rd Army had been encircled, and efforts to free it had failed. On March 20 the STAVKA again ordered Western and Kalinin Fronts to liquidate the German Rzhev–Gzhatsk–Vyazma grouping (essentially German 9th Army during April. As part of this the 16th and 61st Armies were to attack toward Bryansk to order to encircle and destroy the German grouping near Zhizdra and Bolkhov. Ultimately the Soviet forces were too worn down from months of fighting for this to make any progress.

During April the 149th, along with the rest of 61st Army, was transferred to Bryansk Front, but returned to Western Front in June. During the first weeks of July the 61st, along with the 10th and 16th Armies, carried out a series of attacks against 2nd Panzer Army which alarmed the command of Army Group Center, which was almost devoid of reserves. In Western Front's report on combat operations for September it was noted that "battles of local significance" had been fought through the month by most of its armies, including the 61st, before going over to the defense. On October 5 Colonel Fedyunkin left the division temporarily, replaced by Col. Andrei Nikolaevich Volkov, but returned briefly on October 26 before taking command of the 11th Guards Rifle Division on November 4. He would go on to hold several rifle corps commands during the war and would be promoted to the rank of lieutenant general on July 11, 1945. Lt. Col. Andrei Arkhipovich Orlov, who had previously served as the division's chief of staff and deputy commander, took over from November 5 to December 1, when Col. Nikolai Lvovich Volkov arrived from deputy command of the 356th Rifle Division.

=== Bryansk-Smolensk Offensive ===
With the end of the fighting at Stalingrad the besieging Don Front was freed up for duties elsewhere. The 149th was originally to be sent to Northwestern Front, but on February 5, 1943, the STAVKA issued a directive to establish a new Central Front by February 15, under the commander of Don Front, Col. Gen. K. K. Rokossovskii, and mostly using the assets of his former Front. However, the 149th was also identified as part of the new Front and was accordingly transferred to 65th Army. Just after midnight on February 6 Rokossovskii was issued orders to concentrate this Army in the area north of Dolgoe and south of Livny by February 12. It was then to be brought up to a line of deployment within two days between Kursk and Fatezh, along with 2nd Tank Army and 2nd Guards Cavalry Corps. The combined force was then to launch an offensive on February 15 toward Sevsk and Unecha Station, with the goal of cutting the railroad between Bryansk and Gomel. From here, the ambitious plan called for the Front to advance on Smolensk and Gomel, which would only be possible if German resistance effectively collapsed.

Despite strenuous efforts to ensure timely regrouping and concentration of Central Front's forces into their assembly areas and jumping-off positions for the offensive, persistent poor weather and deteriorating road conditions caused delay. The advance of Army Group South toward Kharkiv was an additional complication. Now the plan for the Army was to hold at Ponyri while attacking westward beginning on February 24, ultimately advancing on Roslavl. This was again delayed by 48 hours, as was explained by Rokossovskii's chief of operations:

The march by the main forces of four rifle divisions (the 69th, 149th, and 354th Rifle and 37th Guards) from the Ponyri and Leninskii line to jumping-off positions at Dubrova, Mokhovoe, and Androsovo by day's end on 23 February is continuing. The distance of the march is 60 kilometres. The divisions can be concentrated in their jumping-off positions by the end of 25 February.

In the same report the division was stated as having 6,800 personnel on strength. As well, "[t]he howitzers of all artillery units have lagged behind, and there are no tractors." The ongoing German offensive disrupted all plans and greatly stressed the Soviet formations, ultimately leading to the collapse of the plan.

=== Battle of Kursk ===
Battle of Kursk. Note position of 65th Army.

On June 4 Colonel N. L. Volkov left the division to attend the Voroshilov Academy. He would later command the 5th Guards and 154th Rifle Divisions. Colonel Orlov returned to command, which he would hold until the division was disbanded, being promoted to major general on November 2, 1944. During June the 149th was subordinated to the 18th Rifle Corps, still in 65th Army.

At the outset of Operation Zitadelle the 65th Army was deployed on an 82km frontage along the western face of the Kursk salient between the 60th and 70th Armies of Central Front and facing the German XIII Army Corps of 2nd Army. In the German plan for the operation no attacks were to be made on this sector. 65th Army had nine rifle divisions, with six, including all of 18th Corps, in first echelon, and the remaining three in second echelon.

== Into Ukraine and Belarus ==
In the event the 65th Army did not join the summer offensive until Operation Kutuzov was nearly concluded and Operation Polkhovodets Rumyantsev was well underway. Central Front struck 2nd Army's center at Sevsk and east flank at Klintsy on August 26. The Front's forces quickly broke the German line with 60th Army in the lead. On September 2 the XIII Corps was ordered to fall back to the west and maintain contact with Army Group South, but instead was pushed south across the Seym River into the 4th Panzer Army sector, thereby opening a 30km wide gap between Army Groups South and Center. The following day, 2nd Army withdrew to the Desna River as Rokossovskii paused to regroup. On September 9 the Front's forces forced this river south of Novhorod-Siverskyi and at Otsekin.

Central Front liberated Nizhyn on the Oster River on September 15, which finally triggered the OKH to order a full withdrawal to the Dniepr. Over the next five days the Front staged a two-pronged thrust northward on either side of Chernihiv which collapsed the flank of 2nd Army, allowing it to advance north toward Gomel. As of October 1 the 149th had been reassigned to 27th Rifle Corps, still in 65th Army. The Corps also contained the 193rd Rifle Division and 115th Rifle Brigade.

=== Gomel-Rechytsa Offensive ===
By this time the entire 65th Army had reached the Sozh River between the mouth of the Iput River and Loyew; on September 28 the 354th Division had seized a bridgehead at Novaya Tereshkovichi. The Army was deployed with 27th Corps in the center. Although the Army continued to gain small bridgeheads over the Sozh, its commander, Lt. Gen. P. I. Batov, realized he would have to orchestrate a full-scale attack to enlarge these bridgeheads and force the Germans to abandon Gomel. The main effort would come from the 354th's lodgement, which had already been reinforced, while his 18th and 27th Corps were to conduct supporting attacks farther to the south.

On October 1 three divisions attacked the German 6th Infantry Division's positions from Novaya Tereshkovichi, and having breached them, fanned out to liberate the villages of Noyve and Starye Diatlovichi in heavy fighting. After expanding the bridgehead to a depth of 4km the attack was contained by arriving reserves from 2nd Army. Meanwhile, five divisions of the 18th and 27th Corps, including the 149th, assaulted across the Sozh and seized several shallow bridgeheads but these were soon sealed off by further German reserves. Within days, 65th Army's attacks had bogged down on this sector, and the offensive towards Gomel was temporarily halted. Realizing there was no sense in trying again to crack the German defenses in the narrow belt between the Sozh and Dniepr, from October 8–14 Rokossovskii carried out a major regrouping to the south, into the sector on the Dniepr south of Loyew held by 61st Army. The 149th returned to 18th Corps as part of this regrouping. Overnight on October 15/16 the division forced crossings over the Dniepr near the village of Shittsy.

Some 20 men of the division would be made Heroes of the Soviet Union for distinguishing themselves during the crossing operation. Among them was Krasnoarmeets Grigorii Alekseevich Alekseyev of the 744th Rifle Regiment. After reaching the far bank he helped to repel several counterattacks, personally disabling several tanks with grenades. Despite being wounded several times he refused evacuation. He died in hospital on November 9 before he could be presented with the Gold Star he was awarded on October 30. He was one of eight Alekseyev brothers who served at the front; four died during the fighting, two succumbed to their wounds soon after, leaving just Aleksandr and Mikhail as survivors. Postwar both a book, and a film named Mother's Heart, were made about their mother, Tatyana Nikolaevna Alekseyeva.

When the regrouping was complete a total of 12 rifle divisions, one rifle brigade, plus one tank and two cavalry corps had been gathered on a sector some 45km-wide from 9km north of Loyew to 7km south of Liubech. These faced five German divisions, with the 149th opposite part of the battle-worn 137th Infantry. The 18th and 27th Corps, backed by about 50 tanks and motorized infantry of 9th Tank Corps, attacked on October 20, the day Central Front was renamed Belorussian Front. 18th Corps was on a front from Lake Sviatoe to the Radul River with the 149th and 69th in first echelon and kicked off at 06:30 hours following an artillery preparation. Smoke was used extensively for cover, and the attack was led by six advanced battalions of 250-600 men each, likely with several penal companies. The assaults overran the defense, forcing the German line back about 2km between the Dniepr and the Radul on the first day. This was followed two days later by an attack by 61st Army as the 2nd and 7th Guards Cavalry Corps advanced to expand 65th Army's penetration. After more than a week of heavy fighting the forces of XXXXVI Panzer Corps' Group Lubbe was authorized to begin a phased withdrawal to new positions. By day's end on October 28 the two rifle corps had pushed forward another 15-20km and linked up on the left with the right flank of 61st Army.

The forces of both armies had by now "shot their bolt", and a halt was called on October 30. During the following 10 days the Front carried out a major regrouping, with 65th Army displacing to the south to enter the Loyew bridgehead with most of its forces. Batov's troops were deployed in the center of the bridgehead with 18th Corps on the right flank of the Army. The 149th and 69th Rifle Division were in first echelon on a 5km-wide sector from Lipniaki to Uborok, with two brigades of 9th Tanks in support. The immediate objective was to capture the strongpoint at Volkoshanka and reach the road from Gancharov Podel to Nadvin after an advance of some 5-6km. The 193rd Division, the rest of 9th Tanks, and 2nd Guards Cavalry were in second echelon to serve as an exploitation force.

The renewed offensive began on November 10. In the first three days Rokossovskii's forces tore a gap some 15km wide and 8-12km deep in the defenses from west of Uborok to the Dniepr north of Velin, putting them halfway to Rechytsa. 18th Corps had pushed halfway through the defenses on the first day and completed the penetration on the next, beginning its pursuit with the mobile group. The 69th and 149th had taken their objectives at Volkoshanka and then fought off several counterattacks by 12th Panzer Division. Nadvin held out for two days before the 69th bypassed the village to the west. With the 193rd committed from second echelon the three rifle divisions drove north in the wake of 7th Guards Cavalry, taking Romanovka, Andreevka, Gruzkaya, and Perevoloka on both sides of the Rechytsa–Khoiniki road, placing them 20-23km south of the former place by the evening of November 14 and facing elements of 292nd Infantry Division which had recently arrived to try to form a continuous front. This led to a five-day pitched battle between the 149th and 69th against the 292nd and 12th Panzer for the town of Malodusha, which was also the extreme left flank position of 2nd Army. Meanwhile, fighting for Rechytsa had begun, continuing until it was abandoned on November 20.

Early on November 22 the 61st Army attacked west with its 9th Guards Rifle Corps, unhinging the defenses of XXXXVI Panzer and opening a huge gap in the German line. At the same time, 18th Corps crushed the defenses around Malodusha and came close to encircling the defenders. 2nd Army had no choice but to withdraw its shattered forces to a more defensible line to the west. This continued for six days with Soviet forces making ongoing assaults. Meanwhile, on November 23 the 18th and 95th Rifle Corps had attacked on a broad front on all sides of Novinki. The 69th and 193rd, with the 149th in support, ran up against the 13th Panzer Grenadier Regiment of 5th Panzer Division in the area of Liady and Korma, 30km north of Kalinkavichy, and failed to break its defense; the arrival of this division helped stabilize the German defense north of that city by the end of the month. At about this time the 149th was transferred to 48th Army in the same Front. In a report from around the beginning of December the personnel of the division were stated to be roughly 80 percent Ukrainian.

==== Kalinkavichy Offensive ====
In early December Rokossovskii was still planning to reach Babruysk in accordance with his directives from the STAVKA. However, by this time a firm German defense had been formed around Kalinkavichy and until this could be shifted or destroyed there was no prospect of reaching Babruysk. In addition, he was about to lose forces to 1st Ukrainian Front to the south. The 149th, 140th, and 246th were to be sent by December 15, with another three following by December 18-19. In the meantime, 48th Army was tasked with battling with XXXV Army Corps which was trying to stem the advance between the Dniepr and Berezina Rivers from south of Zhlobin westward to Parychy. The offensive, which began on December 8, did not greatly involve 48th Army and ran out of steam by December 12. On December 19 the division entered 24th Rifle Corps of 1st Ukrainian Front's 13th Army. It would remain in this Front for the duration of the war.

=== Proskurov–Chernovtsy Offensive ===
Under these commands it took part in the Rovno–Lutsk offensive. It very soon won a battle honor:

NOVOGRAD-VOLYNSKII - ...149th Rifle Division (Colonel Orlov, Andrei Arkhipovich)... The troops who participated in the liberation of Novograd-Volynskii, by the order of the Supreme High Command of 3 January 1944, and a commendation in Moscow, are given a salute of 12 artillery salvoes from 124 guns.

Shortly after, on February 7 the division was also awarded the Order of the Red Banner for general exemplary performance, valor and courage.

1st Ukrainian Front launched its part of the Proskurov–Chernovtsy offensive on March 4. 13th Army was tasked with driving from Dubno to Brody. Caught between 13th and 1st Guards Army the LIX Army Corps on the left flank of 1st Panzer Army retreated to the south away from Shepetivka. By March 6 the front between 1st and 4th Panzer Armies had been ripped open on a front of 140km, and LIX Corps was cut off at Starokostiantyniv. Over the following four days the German defense began to gel, and on March 8 Hitler issued Führer Order 11, which declared Brody, among other places, a "fortress". By March 11 the front, commanded by Marshal I. S. Konev, had unhinged the line of 1st Panzer on its right. 13th Army advanced to Brody but was unable to take the place. By March 25 1st Panzer had been encircled and the remainder of the campaign, which continued until April 17, largely revolved on the efforts to break this encirclement, which eventually succeeded.

=== Lvov–Sandomierz Offensive ===
During March the 149th had been reassigned to the 102nd Rifle Corps, still in 13th Army, but in April it was moved again, now to the 76th Rifle Corps in 3rd Guards Army. It would remain in this Army for the duration.

In preparation for the summer offensive into Poland the 3rd Guards Army was positioned on the right (north) flank of 1st Ukrainian Front, and 76th Corps was located on the right flank of the Army's shock group, with 106th Rifle Division in first echelon, the 149th in second, and the 181st Rifle Division in third. By July 10 the Front command had received information about possible German withdrawals from several vulnerable sectors prior to the main offensive. In response all first echelon divisions were to form reconnaissance detachments of reinforced rifle companies to begin combat operations at 22:00 hours on July 12, continuing until 01:00 hours on the 13th. The reconnaissance confirmed that the main German forces facing 3rd Guards and the right flank of 13th Army were pulling back under cover of rearguards. At 03:00 the Army's forward battalions went over to the attack, and moved forward to the next prepared defensive line. The assault continued at 05:15 hours on July 14 following a 30-minute artillery preparation and faced counterattacks from the 16th and 17th Panzer Divisions. The next day at 08:00 hours the Army began to penetrate the second German defensive belt; during the day the 76th Corps advanced as much as 8km in pursuit supported by armor and air attacks. This line, anchored on the Luha River, was eventually forced and by the end of July 31 the Corps reached the Vistula and had taken a small bridgehead near Annopol.

Lt. Col. Pyotr Korneevich Babak, commander of the 479th Rifle Regiment, was one of the leaders of this crossing operation. He had already been nominated by General Orlov for the Hero of the Soviet Union award for the Dniepr crossing. Overnight on July 31/August 1 he landed in the first boat near the village of Debno under artillery and machine gun fire and led the battle over several hours to establish and expand the lodgement. By dawn it was up to 3km wide and 1,500m deep, enough to provide a foothold for the entire division. He was awarded his Gold Star on September 23. Babak led his regiment for the duration, and remained in the Soviet Army until he went into reserve in 1956. He retired to Chișinău where he died on February 22, 1992. The 149th as a whole was quickly awarded the Order of Kutuzov, 2nd Degree, for this success. In September the division was reassigned to the 120th Rifle Corps with the 106th Division.

== Into Poland and Germany ==
At the start of the Vistula-Oder offensive the 120th Corps also had the 197th Rifle Division under command. 3rd Guards Army was now under command of Col. Gen. V. N. Gordov. When the offensive began on January 12 the Corps was in the Army's first echelon. It remained in this position as the Army began approaching the Oder River on January 28; this river and the Silesian industrial area were the immediate objectives of the Front. By the end of January, the 3rd Guards Army had all three of its Corps deployed in a single echelon and was attacking along a sector 70km wide. The 21st and 120th Corps were overcoming the resistance of German 9th Army, which was falling back to the southwest under pressure of the 1st Belorussian Front. 120th Corps was now committed to encircle a German grouping in the area of Leszno in cooperation with 21st Rifle Corps. In the course of three days this grouping of 15,000 troops was defeated, with many forced to surrender. By this time most of the rifle divisions involved in the offensive averaged about 5,500 personnel each. On February 19 the division would be awarded the Order of Suvorov, 2nd Degree, for its part in the battle for Kielce, and on the same date the 314th Artillery Regiment received the Order of Kutuzov, 3rd Degree and the 271st Antitank Battalion won the Order of Bogdan Khmelnitsky, 3rd Degree, for their successes in the fighting for the towns of Ostrów Wielkopolski and Els.

=== Lower Silesian Offensive ===
On January 31 Marshal Konev ordered Gordov to continue an energetic offensive with 120th Corps and the 25th Tank Corps, and by the end of February 2 to reach the Oder along the sector Odereck–Glogau, where it was to establish tactical cooperation with units of 1st Belorussian Front. By that date the Corps reached the river along the Kleinitz–Lippen sector, but was unable to force a crossing. At this point, 3rd Guards Army was stretched across a frontage of 104km. By February 8 the 120th Corps had been deployed to cover 96km of this, along with the 127th Rifle Division of 21st Corps, while the remainder of that Corps and the 76th Corps were concentrated to conducted the next main attack.

During the first days of this assault the German 72nd Infantry Division continued to try to hold a bridgehead on the right bank of the Gross Land Canal, but during February 9-10 the 120th Corps crushed this resistance and reached the Oder along a front from Aufhalt to Rabsen. At the same time, the German forces continued to put up fierce resistance in an effort to hold the fortress area of Glogau and Breslau, often counterattacking and bringing up additional forces. While 120th Corps advanced north of Glogau, the remainder of 3rd Guards Army's shock force continued to roll up the German defense along the Oder, bypassing the Glogau area from the south. However, Konev continued to urge Gordov to speed up the defeat of the Glogau grouping and vigorously advance toward the Bóbr River. The next day Gordov began carrying out this assignment, and the fiercest fighting unfolded in the Glogau area. Despite desperate German efforts the 3rd Guards Army persistently threw them out of one inhabited locale after another and by the end of the day units of 21st Corps had outflanked the city from the north, east and south. A retreat route remained open, but was already threatened with being cut by the Army's left flank formations. It was clear that the garrison at Glogau was not preparing to abandon the place and was trying to distract to itself as many Soviet troops as possible.

Insofar as Glogau was heavily fortified the battle for its capture might have stretched out for a long time and tied down significant forces. Thus the decision was made to encircle it and leave behind the 329th Rifle Division to blockade the fortress while the remaining forces of the Army's shock group continued the offensive. 21st Corps, with the 25th Tanks, completed cutting off the Glogau garrison before continuing to advance westward to roll up the defense along the Oder beginning on February 12, while 120th Corps was pulled back to the Army's second echelon.

Following the defeat and encirclement of XXIV Panzer Corps in the Glogau area the pace of 3rd Guards Army's advance began to increase rapidly because the Corps' remnants began falling back hurriedly, putting up little resistance. By February 15 the entire bend of the Oder had been cleared of German forces, and 3rd Guards, having captured the towns of Grossen and Naumburg, had reached the Bóbr from its mouth to Naumburg. The arrival of the Army at the Bóbr significantly improved the situation along the right flank of the Front's main shock group. The width of the Army's attack front shrank from 104km to 36km.

By February 16 the line of the Bóbr and Kweis rivers was being defended by three corps of 4th Panzer Army. XXXX Panzer Corps faced the 3rd Guards Army. According to Konev's plan for the next phase of the offensive the Front's main group of forces, including 3rd Guards, was to reach the Neisse River, capture bridgeheads on the west bank, and securely consolidate along the line reached. On orders from Konev, Gordov launched his following attack along his Army's right wing to make use of the Grossen–Guben paved road. By the end of the day the 120th Corps had been brought up to the 21st Corps attack sector, followed by the 25th Tanks. On the morning of the 17th the tankers, in cooperation with units of 21st Corps, crushed the resistance of the "Matterstock" Special Designation Division and advanced 12km toward Guben. In a successful drive the 120th Corps reached a line from Polo to Kanig to Grocho by day's end on February 19, and part of its forces were in Zaude, fighting in its east outskirts. Overnight, remnants of the 2.SS-Sturmbrigade Dirlewanger and 16th Panzer, retreating toward Guben, ran into the Polo–Kanig line and began a fight that continued through the next day. This did not prevent the Corps from completing the capture of the strongpoint of Lindenheim and entering the wooded area northeast of Guben. Altogether as a result of the fighting during February 15–20 the 3rd Guards Army had crushed German resistance along the Bóbr and reached the Neisse with its right flank along a 10km sector.

The next day the Army's 76th Corps, plus the main forces of 13th Army also reached the Neisse in the sector controlled by 4th Tank Army. Although there were efforts to take bridgeheads on the west bank these were ultimately unsuccessful and the Front's forces consolidated on the east bank. Before the end of the month the 149th returned to this Corps into early April.

== Berlin Offensive ==
At the start of the Berlin offensive the 3rd Guards Army was still deployed on the east bank of the Neisse along a 28km front from Groß Gastrose to Klein Bademüsel. The 120th Corps now contained the 197th, 149th, and 127th Rifle Divisions. The Corps was grouped along the axis of the main attack with the three divisions of 21st Corps. The main attack would be launched along the Army's left wing, forcing the river on a 9km sector from outside Forst to outside Klein Bademüsel. The 120th Corps had the 149th and 127th in first echelon and the 197th in second echelon. The Army's second echelon consisted of 25th Tank Corps.

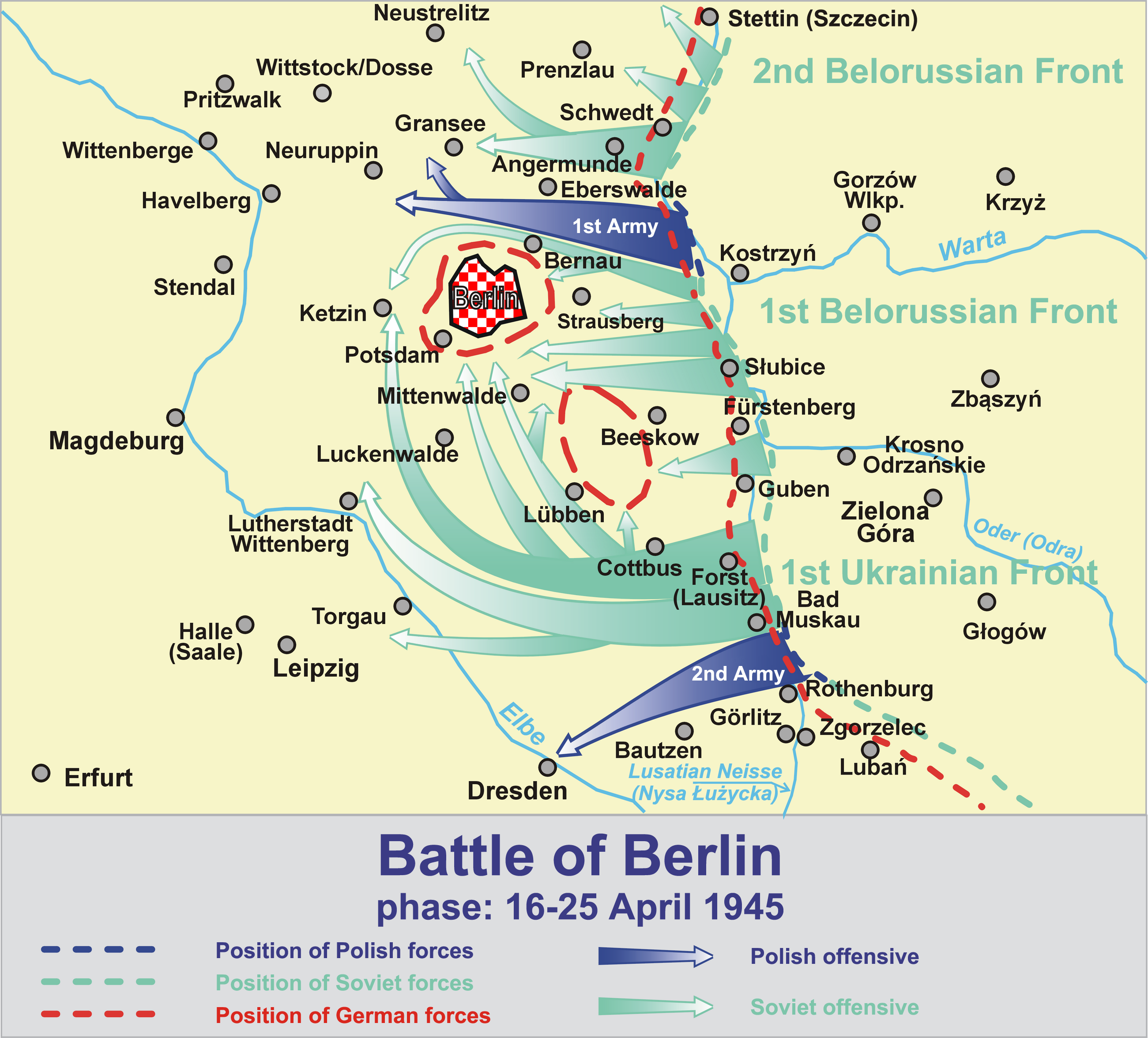
Battle of Berlin. Note locations of Forst and Cottbus and eventual encirclement of German 9th Army.

The offensive began on April 16. The 149th and 127th Divisions, operating with 25th Tanks, broke through the German main defense zone. By the end of the day the Corps had reached a line from the south part of Forst to Damsdorf, having advanced 4-5km. The success of the attack was aided to a significant degree by the Front's aviation, which destroyed Koine, a German strongpoint in the main defensive zone. The 6th Guards Tank Corps of 3rd Guards Tank Army began crossing the Neisse at 14:00 hours, completing this by 1900, and by the end of the day its forward brigades were fighting alongside 120th and 21st Corps for Damsdorf.

The next day 3rd Guards Army, still with 6th Guards Tanks in support, resumed the attack at 09:00 hours, encountering heavy resistance as it advanced on Cottbus. The 197th was moved up from second echelon, and 120th Corps, still working with 25th Tanks, captured the Adlig-Dubrau strongpoint and, having advanced 5-7km, by the end of the day was fighting along a line from the southern outskirts of Forst to the southern outskirts of Eilo to the southern outskirts of Gosda to Adlig-Dubrau. On April 18 the 149th exchanged assignments with the 106th Division from 76th Corps, joined the 76th in capturing Forst after heavy combat, then advanced 3km northward along the Neisse. By dusk the Corps was fighting for Sakro and Mulknitz, still facing north.

During April 19 the 3rd Guards Army encountered stubborn resistance from the Germans' Cottbus group of forces. The city was one of the most important resistance centers in the third defense zone. During the day 76th Corps completed the breakthrough of the second defensive zone, codenamed "Matilda", during the course of an advance of 9km, and by day's end had reached the line Tranitz–Sadersdorf, in the intermediate zone facing northwest between the second and third. The next day the Army continued to fight along the intermediate position on a line from outside Gross Lieskow to Schliechow to Karen, having advanced 1-2km, but running into heavy fire 76th Corps made no advance at all. With the support of an advance by 21st Corps the 3rd Guards Tank Army managed to cut the German grouping's retreat route to the west and pinned it to the Spree River's swampy flood plain.

Over the next two days of stubborn fighting the 3rd Guards Army took Cottbus by storm and eliminated the Cottbus grouping, routing the 342nd, 214th and 275th Infantry Divisions plus a number of other elements and units. 1,500 prisoners were taken, plus 100 tanks, 2,000 motor vehicles, 60 guns, and several depots of military equipment. With the elimination of the Cottbus grouping the Army had enveloped the German Frankfurt–Guben grouping, which was based on the 9th Army, from the south and southwest. Even after this fighting ended the 76th Corps remained engaged along a line from Sadersdorf to Heinersbruck to Mertzdorf.

=== Encirclement battle with 9th Army ===
During April 23 the 3rd Guards Army, in order to prevent a breakout by 9th Army, and to securely close the Lübbenau–Oderin sector, by the end of the day was moving its main forces to its left flank. 76th Corps made only a minor advance with its left flank and was fighting on a line from Sadersdorf to Heinersbruck to Zillow. 25th Tanks was concentrated in its rear to reinforce the Beeskow–Lübben axis. The encircled German grouping contained about 200,000 men, more than 2,000 guns and mortars, and more than 200 tanks and assault guns. As the result of the lateral regrouping the 3rd Guards had firmly closed all avenues to a German retreat to the south and southwest, having created a solid front of rifle units.

The commander of the encircled grouping, Gen. der Inf. T. Busse, received orders from Hitler on April 25 to break through the encirclement ring and attack in the direction of Halbe in an effort to link up with 12th Army, which was operating southwest of Berlin. On the morning of April 26 the 76th Corps was still fighting to reduce the pocket in an area from outside the Bilenersee to Muhlendorf. Gordov was ordered to maintain one division in reserve in Teupitz; to block all the forest roads running from east to west; to create strongpoints along the Cottbus–Berlin road; and take several other measures to prevent a breakout. 76th Corps would continue to attack toward Straupitz and Schlepzig. After an overnight regrouping the German command had created a powerful breakthrough grouping led by 50 tanks to strike the boundary between 3rd Guards and 28th Armies. By 10:00 hours it had created a gap between 329th and 58th Divisions in the Halbe area and had cut the Baruth–Zossen highway, which was the main communications artery for both Soviet armies. The just-arrived 389th Rifle Division, along with the 25th Tanks, counterattacked the breakthrough group from the Stackow area and isolated it from the remainder of the 9th Army. As a result of fighting during the remainder of the day and overnight a significant part of the breakthrough group was destroyed in the woods northeast of Baruth.

Following the elimination of the breakthrough group the encircled German forces were occupying no more than 900km^{2}. On April 27, Gordov was ordered to preempt the formation of another breakthrough group by attacking with his first echelon divisions from the south and west in the general direction of Münchehofe. The 149th and 253rd Rifle Divisions were to take up defensive positions along the line from Terpt and further north along the highway as far as Neuendorf. Despite these efforts the 9th Army made a further effort to break through the encirclement ring in the direction of Halbe. During the day numerous efforts were made by groups of up to 1,000 men, supported by armor, but none were successful. 1st Belorussian Front's 3rd Army linked up with units of 21st Corps in the Lopten–Halbe area. By this time the division was operating under Gordov's direct command.

As a result of the April 27 fighting the German group of forces in the woods north of Baruth was eliminated, as were all their attempts to again organize a breakthrough to the west. By now the pocket had shrunk to about 400km^{2}. During the next day forces of both Fronts continued squeezing the ring. In the morning the 9th Army made another effort to escape through the Halbe area with a group up to an infantry division in strength, supported by up to 18-20 tanks. This struck the sector Teirow–Lopten occupied by 21st Corps and 40th Rifle Corps of 3rd Army. By the end of the day, having beaten off 12 German attacks, the units of both Corps continued to hold their previous positions, taking prisoners and seizing equipment. By the end of the day the pocket was about 10km north-to-south and up to 14km east-to-west.

The German command faced the prospect of complete defeat of 9th Army and so overnight undertook a new and decisive attempt to break out with the bulk of its remaining forces in an effort to link up with another break-in attempt by 12th Army. The attack began at 01:00 hours on April 29, led by up to 10,000 infantry, supported by 35-40 tanks, at the Teirow–Halbe boundary. At dawn, following heavy fighting, the German grouping managed to break through the 21st and 40th Corps, reach the Staatsforst Stachow woods and cut the highway 3km southeast of Tornow. The breakout was temporarily halted by units of 28th Army's 3rd Guards Rifle Corps but the German grouping was now reinforced to a strength of up to 45,000 troops and created a 2km-wide breach between 50th Guards and 54th Guards Rifle Divisions in the Münchendorf area. Taking advantage of this breach, despite powerful artillery and mortar fire from north and south, German forces began to break out, first in small groups and then in entire columns, to the Staatsforst Kummersdorf woods. By the end of the day the breakout had again been halted by reinforcements from 3rd Guards and 4th Guards Tank Armies and the 117th Guards Rifle Division. At the same time the 120th and 76th Corps were attacking toward 21st Corps in an effort to re-close the gap in the Teirow sector. As a result of these and other counterattacks the greater part of 9th Army was again encircled. It was still 30km from 12th Army.

Overnight, the Army commanders of 1st Ukrainian Front undertook a number of measures directed at preventing any further German advance to the west and finally eliminating the pocketed forces. Gordov directed his Corps operating in the Tornow–Freidorf area to destroy the German units by attacks from the east. Meanwhile, the German grouping continued to make desperate efforts to escape, gaining another 10km to the west. By the end of the day 3rd Guards Army, fighting through the Staatsforst Stachow woods, destroyed the tail end of the grouping. At this point its remnants had been split into separate groups which were out of contact with each other, and mass surrenders began; 1st Ukrainian Front alone took 24,000 prisoners. The last resistance ended on May 1.

== Postwar ==
When the shooting stopped the division was advancing on Prague with most of its Front's forces, carrying the full title of 149th Rifle, Novograd-Volinskii, Order of the Red Banner, Order of Suvorov and Kutuzov Division. (Russian: 149-я стрелковая Новоград-Волынская Краснознамённая орденов Суворова и Кутузова дивизия.) In final honors on June 4 all four of the divisions regiments were awarded the Order of Alexander Nevsky and the 271st Antitank Battalion won the Order of the Red Star, all for their roles in the liquidation of German 9th Army. General Orlov was appointed deputy commander of 32nd Guards Rifle Corps in the Central Group of Forces, and later led the 357th and 73rd Rifle Divisions before his retirement in July 1959. He died in Volgograd on November 27, 1981.

According to STAVKA Order No. 11096 of May 29, 1945, part 8, the 149th is listed as one of the rifle divisions to be "disbanded in place". It was disbanded in accordance with the directive between July 10–15.
