= Ersatz (disambiguation) =

An ersatz good is a substitute good, especially one that is considered inferior to the good it replaces.

Ersatz may also refer to:

- Ersatz (film), a 1961 short animation
- Ersatz (album), a 2008 album by Julien Doré
- "Ersatz" (short story), a 1967 science fiction short story

== See also ==
- Ersatz Audio, an independent record label
- The Ersatz Elevator, the sixth novel in the book series A Series of Unfortunate Events
