= Sobolyata =

Sobolyata Соболята
- Village
- Location within Perm Krai Location within Russia
- Coordinates: 58°06′N 54°50′E
- Country: Russia
- Region: Perm Krai
- District: Vereshchaginsky District
- Time zone: UTC+5:00

Sobolyata (Russian: Соболята) is a rural locality (a village) in Vereshchaginsky District, Perm Krai, Russia. The population was 146 as of 2010. There are 2 streets.

== Geography ==
Sobolyata is located 14 km northeast of Vereshchagino (the district's administrative centre) by road. Buzynyata is the nearest rural locality.
