= Boroduli =

Boroduli Бородули
- Village
- Location within Perm Krai Location within Russia
- Coordinates: 58°04′N 54°45′E
- Country: Russia
- Region: Perm Krai
- District: Vereshchaginsky District
- Time zone: UTC+5:00

Boroduli (Russian: Бородули) is a rural locality (a village) and the administrative center of Borodulskoye Rural Settlement, Vereshchaginsky District, Perm Krai, Russia. The population was 476 as of 2010. There are 23 streets.

== Geography ==
Boroduli is located 7 km east of Vereshchagino (the district's administrative centre) by road. Tolkovyata is the nearest rural locality.
