= Moskvyata =

Moskvyata (Russian: Москвята) is the name of several rural localities in Russia:

- Moskvyata, Vereshchaginsky District, Perm Krai, a village in Vereshchaginsky District, Perm Krai
- Moskvyata, Permsky District, Perm Krai, a village in Permsky District, Perm Krai
