= Durovo =

Durovo (Russian: Дурово) is the name of several rural localities in Russia:

- Durovo, Vereshchaginsky District, Perm Krai, a village in Vereshchaginsky District, Perm Krai
- Durovo, Kochyovsky District, Perm Krai, a village in Kochyovsky District, Perm Krai
