= Fedyashino =

Fedyashino Федяшино
- Village
- Location within Perm Krai Location within Russia
- Coordinates: 58°00′N 54°10′E
- Country: Russia
- Region: Perm Krai
- District: Vereshchaginsky District
- Time zone: UTC+5:00

Fedyashino (Russian: Федяшино) is a rural locality (a village) in Vereshchaginsky District, Perm Krai, Russia. The population was 106 as of 2010.

== Geography ==
Fedyashino is located 36 km west of Vereshchagino (the district's administrative centre) by road. Martely is the nearest rural locality.
