= Yevgeny Obukhov =

Yevgeny Mikhailovich Obukhov
- Евгений Михайлович Обухов
- Born: 1921; Malga village, Okhansky Uyezd, Perm Governorate, RSFSR
- Died: 13 March 1944 (aged 22–23); Maloye Fomkino village, Pskov Oblast, Soviet Union
- Military career
- Allegiance: Soviet Union
- Branch: Red Army
- Service years: 1942–1944
- Rank: Sergeant
- Unit: 253rd Rifle Division
- Conflicts: World War II; Battle of the Dnieper
- Awards: Hero of the Soviet Union

Yevgeny Mikhailovich Obukhov (Russian: Евге́ний Миха́йлович Обу́хов; 1921 – 13 March 1944) was a Red Army sergeant and Hero of the Soviet Union. Obukhov was awarded the title Hero of the Soviet Union and the Order of Lenin for his actions during the Battle of the Dnieper. He was killed in action a short time later.

== Early life ==
Obukhov was born in 1921 in the village of Malga in Perm Governorate to a peasant family. After graduation from junior high school, he worked in the Vereshchagino regional communications center.

== World War II ==
In January 1942, Obukhov was drafted into the Red Army. He fought in combat from February 1942. By the summer of 1943, Obukhov was a squad leader in the 253rd Rifle Division's 551st Separate Combat Engineer Battalion. He fought in the Battle of the Dnieper during the fall.

On 25 September, Obukhov was appointed commander of a pontoon boat for the Dnieper crossing. He first reached the river's west bank with 25 soldiers. While still crossing the river, the pontoon came under German fire while 100 meters from the shore. Bullet holes were causing the pontoon to sink when Obukhov reportedly began patching holes with overcoats and caps. He reportedly ordered the soldiers to do the same and they were able to successfully cross the river, keeping the pontoon afloat. During the landing, the infantry officer commanding the soldiers was wounded when German troops opened fire with automatic weapons and Obukhov reportedly replaced him in command. Obukhov organized machine gun fire and was able to neutralize the German positions. Another German machine gun was firing from a bunker, preventing the crossing of more pontoon boats. Obukhov reportedly crawled up to the bunker and destroyed the machine gun, killing its crew with two anti-tank grenades. Obukhov then repaired his pontoon and reportedly managed to cross the Dnieper again, ferrying two antitank guns and 50 soldiers.

In the afternoon, Obukhov ferried 12 wounded soldiers across the Dnieper while under fire. He reportedly crossed the Dnieper 30 times over the next two days and reportedly ferried over 650 soldiers and 6 anti-tank guns. On 24 October, he was awarded the Order of the Patriotic War 2nd class for his actions. In December, Obukhov was transferred with the division to the Leningrad Front. On 10 January 1944, he was awarded the title Hero of the Soviet Union and the Order of Lenin for his actions on the Dnieper. Obukhov was killed in action on 14 March during a battle in the village of Maloye Fomkino, Pskov Oblast. He was buried in the nearby village of Keb.
