= Zaytsy =

Zaytsy Зайцы
- Village
- Location within Perm Krai Location within Russia
- Coordinates: 58°02′N 54°39′E
- Country: Russia
- Region: Perm Krai
- District: Vereshchaginsky District
- Time zone: UTC+5:00

Zaytsy (Russian: Зайцы) is a rural locality (a village) in Vereshchaginskoye Urban Settlement, Vereshchaginsky District, Perm Krai, Russia. The population was 56 as of 2010.

== Geography ==
Zaytsy is located 5 km south of Vereshchagino (the district's administrative centre) by road. Borshchovtsy is the nearest rural locality.
