= Tyurikovo =

Tyurikovo Тюриково
- Village
- Location within Perm Krai Location within Russia
- Coordinates: 58°04′N 54°48′E
- Country: Russia
- Region: Perm Krai
- District: Vereshchaginsky District
- Time zone: UTC+5:00

Tyurikovo (Russian: Тюриково) is a rural locality (a village) in Vereshchaginsky District, Perm Krai, Russia. The population was 170 as of 2010. There are 3 streets.

== Geography ==
Tyurikovo is located 10 km east of Vereshchagino (the district's administrative centre) by road. Strizhi is the nearest rural locality.
