= Putino =

Putino (Russian: Путино) is the name of several rural localities in Russia:

- Putino (passing loop), a passing loop in Vereshchaginsky District, Perm Krai
- Putino (selo), a selo in Vereshchaginsky District
