= Kukety =

Kukety Кукеты
- Village
- Location within Perm Krai Location within Russia
- Coordinates: 58°06′N 54°54′E
- Country: Russia
- Region: Perm Krai
- District: Vereshchaginsky District
- Time zone: UTC+5:00

Kukety (Russian: Кукеты) is a rural locality (a village) in Vereshchaginsky District, Perm Krai, Russia. The population was 279 as of 2010. There are 8 streets.

== Geography ==
Kukety is located 18 km east of Vereshchagino (the district's administrative centre) by road. Krutiki is the nearest rural locality.
