= Volegovo =

Volegovo Волегово
- Passing loop
- Location within Perm Krai Location within Russia
- Coordinates: 57°57′N 54°16′E
- Country: Russia
- Region: Perm Krai
- District: Vereshchaginsky District
- Time zone: UTC+5:00

Volegovo (Russian: Волегово) is a rural locality (a passing loop) in Vereshchaginsky District, Perm Krai, Russia. The population was 11 as of 2010.

== Geography ==
Volegovo is located 33 km southwest of Vereshchagino (the district's administrative centre) by road. Nizhniye Garevskiye is the nearest rural locality.
