= Tolkovyata =

Tolkovyata Толковята
- Village
- Location within Perm Krai Location within Russia
- Coordinates: 58°04′N 54°43′E
- Country: Russia
- Region: Perm Krai
- District: Vereshchaginsky District
- Time zone: UTC+5:00

Tolkovyata (Russian: Толковята) is a rural locality (a village) in Vereshchaginsky District, Perm Krai, Russia. The population was 40 as of 2010.

== Geography ==
Tolkovyata is located 5 km east of Vereshchagino (the district's administrative centre) by road. Boroduli is the nearest rural locality.
