= Kalinichi =

Kalinichi Калиничи
- Village
- Location within Perm Krai Location within Russia
- Coordinates: 58°01′N 54°12′E
- Country: Russia
- Region: Perm Krai
- District: Vereshchaginsky District
- Time zone: UTC+5:00

Kalinichi (Russian: Калиничи) is a rural locality (a village) in Vereshchaginsky District, Perm Krai, Russia. The population was 33 as of 2010.

== Geography ==
Kalinichi is located 33 km west of Vereshchagino (the district's administrative centre) by road. Katayevo is the nearest rural locality.
