= Gavryukhino =

Gavryukhino Гаврюхино
- Village
- Location within Perm Krai Location within Russia
- Coordinates: 58°12′N 54°45′E
- Country: Russia
- Region: Perm Krai
- District: Vereshchaginsky District
- Time zone: UTC+5:00

Gavryukhino (Russian: Гаврюхино) is a rural locality (a village) in Vereshchaginsky District, Perm Krai, Russia. The population was 21 as of 2010.

== Geography ==
Gavryukhino is located 24 km northeast of Vereshchagino (the district's administrative centre) by road. Kuzminka is the nearest rural locality.
