= Klyuchi (Putinskoye Rural Settlement), Vereshchaginsky District, Perm Krai =

Klyuchi Ключи
- Village
- Location within Perm Krai Location within Russia
- Coordinates: 58°04′N 54°18′E
- Country: Russia
- Region: Perm Krai
- District: Vereshchaginsky District
- Time zone: UTC+5:00

Klyuchi (Russian: Ключи) is a rural locality (a village) in Vereshchaginsky District, Perm Krai, Russia. The population was 100 as of 2010.

== Geography ==
Klyuchi is located 28 km west of Vereshchagino (the district's administrative centre) by road. Putino is the nearest rural locality.
