= Shavrino =

Shavrino Шаврино
- Village
- Location within Perm Krai Location within Russia
- Coordinates: 58°02′N 54°16′E
- Country: Russia
- Region: Perm Krai
- District: Vereshchaginsky District
- Time zone: UTC+5:00

Shavrino (Russian: Шаврино) is a rural locality (a village) in Vereshchaginsky District, Perm Krai, Russia. The population was 11 as of 2010.

== Geography ==
It is located 29 km west of Vereshchagino (the district's administrative centre) by road. Cherepanovo is the nearest rural locality.
