= Vereshchaginsky =

Vereshchaginsky (masculine), Vereshchaginskaya (feminine), or Vereshchaginskoye (neuter) may refer to:

- Vereshchaginsky District, a district of Perm Krai, Russia
- Vereshchaginskoye Urban Settlement, a municipal formation which the town of Vereshchagino and ten rural localities in Vereshchaginsky District of Perm Krai, Russia are incorporated as
