= Borodulino =

Borodulino Бородулино
- Settlement
- Location within Perm Krai Location within Russia
- Coordinates: 57°59′N 54°22′E
- Country: Russia
- Region: Perm Krai
- District: Vereshchaginsky District
- Time zone: UTC+5:00

Borodulino (Russian: Бородулино) is a rural locality (a settlement) in Vereshchaginsky District, Perm Krai, Russia. The population was 1,068 as of 2010. There are 22 streets.

== Geography ==
Borodulino is located 23 km southwest of Vereshchagino (the district's administrative centre) by road. Ageyevo is the nearest rural locality.
