= Leushkanovo =

Leushkanovo Леушканово
- Village
- Location within Perm Krai Location within Russia
- Coordinates: 58°04′N 54°17′E
- Country: Russia
- Region: Perm Krai
- District: Vereshchaginsky District
- Time zone: UTC+5:00

Leushkanovo (Russian: Леушканово) is a rural locality (a village) in Vereshchaginsky District, Perm Krai, Russia. The population was 120 as of 2010.

== Geography ==
Leushkanovo is located 28 km west of Vereshchagino (the district's administrative centre) by road. Putino is the nearest rural locality.
