= Saltykovo =

Saltykovo Салтыково
- Village
- Location within Perm Krai Location within Russia
- Coordinates: 58°16′22″N 54°39′08″E
- Country: Russia
- Region: Perm Krai
- District: Vereshchaginsky District
- Time zone: UTC+5:00

Saltykovo (Russian: Салтыково) is a rural locality (a village) in Vereshchaginsky District, Perm Krai, Russia. The population was 110 as of 2010.

== Geography ==
Saltykovo is located 28 km north of Vereshchagino (the district's administrative centre) by road. Yelino is the nearest rural locality.
