= Kozhevniki =

Kozhevniki Кожевники
- Village
- Location within Perm Krai Location within Russia
- Coordinates: 58°05′N 54°54′E
- Country: Russia
- Region: Perm Krai
- District: Vereshchaginsky District
- Time zone: UTC+5:00

Kozhevniki (Russian: Кожевники) is a rural locality (a village) in Vereshchaginsky District, Perm Krai, Russia. The population was 41 as of 2010.

== Geography ==
Kozhevniki is located 19 km east of Vereshchagino (the district's administrative centre) by road. Moskvyata is the nearest rural locality.
