= Katayevo =

Katayevo Катаево
- Village
- Location within Perm Krai Location within Russia
- Coordinates: 58°02′N 54°13′E
- Country: Russia
- Region: Perm Krai
- District: Vereshchaginsky District
- Time zone: UTC+5:00

Katayevo (Russian: Катаево) is a rural locality (a village) in Vereshchaginsky District, Perm Krai, Russia. The population was 58 as of 2010.

== Geography ==
Katayevo is located 32 km west of Vereshchagino (the district's administrative centre) by road. Kalinichi is the nearest rural locality.
