= Nizhniye Khomyaki =

Nizhniye Khomyaki Нижние Хомяки
- Village
- Location within Perm Krai Location within Russia
- Coordinates: 58°01′N 54°38′E
- Country: Russia
- Region: Perm Krai
- District: Vereshchaginsky District
- Time zone: UTC+5:00

Nizhniye Khomyaki (Russian: Нижние Хомяки) is a rural locality (a village) in Vereshchaginskoye Urban Settlement, Vereshchaginsky District, Perm Krai, Russia. The population was 5 as of 2010.

== Geography ==
Nizhniye Khomyaki is located 6 km south of Vereshchagino (the district's administrative centre) by road. Subbotniki is the nearest rural locality.
