= Krutiki =

Krutiki Крутики
- Village
- Location within Perm Krai Location within Russia
- Coordinates: 58°06′N 54°54′E
- Country: Russia
- Region: Perm Krai
- District: Vereshchaginsky District
- Time zone: UTC+5:00

Krutiki (Russian: Крутики) is a rural locality (a village) in Vereshchaginsky District, Perm Krai, Russia. The population was 21 as of 2010.

== Geography ==
Krutiki is located 18 km east of Vereshchagino (the district's administrative centre) by road. Kukety is the nearest rural locality.
