= Loginovo, Vereshchaginsky District, Perm Krai =

Loginovo Логиново
- Village
- Location within Perm Krai Location within Russia
- Coordinates: 58°02′N 54°36′E
- Country: Russia
- Region: Perm Krai
- District: Vereshchaginsky District
- Time zone: UTC+5:00

Loginovo (Russian: Логиново) is a rural locality (a village) in Vereshchaginskoye Urban Settlement, Vereshchaginsky District, Perm Krai, Russia. The population was 37 as of 2010.

== Geography ==
Loginovo is located 9 km southwest of Vereshchagino (the district's administrative centre) by road. Subbotniki is the nearest rural locality.
