= Buzynyata =

Buzynyata Бузынята
- Village
- Location within Perm Krai Location within Russia
- Coordinates: 58°05′N 54°46′E
- Country: Russia
- Region: Perm Krai
- District: Vereshchaginsky District
- Time zone: UTC+5:00

Buzynyata (Russian: Бузынята) is a rural locality (a village) in Vereshchaginsky District, Perm Krai, Russia. The population was 6 as of 2010. There are 2 streets.

== Geography ==
Buzynyata is located 9 km east of Vereshchagino (the district's administrative centre) by road. Peleni is the nearest rural locality.
