= Oshchepkovo =

Oshchepkovo Ощепково
- Village
- Location within Perm Krai Location within Russia
- Coordinates: 58°02′N 54°42′E
- Country: Russia
- Region: Perm Krai
- District: Vereshchaginsky District
- Time zone: UTC+5:00

Oshchepkovo (Russian: Ощепково) is a rural locality (a village) in Vereshchaginsky District, Perm Krai, Russia. The population was 37 as of 2010.

== Geography ==
Oshchepkovo is located 6 km southeast of Vereshchagino (the district's administrative centre) by road. Gudyri is the nearest rural locality.
