= Sidoryata =

Sidoryata Сидорята
- Village
- Location within Perm Krai Location within Russia
- Coordinates: 58°02′N 54°20′E
- Country: Russia
- Region: Perm Krai
- District: Vereshchaginsky District
- Time zone: UTC+5:00

Sidoryata (Russian: Сидорята) is a rural locality (a village) in Vereshchaginsky District, Perm Krai, Russia. The population was 87 as of 2010.

== Geography ==
Sidoryata is located 28 km west of Vereshchagino (the district's administrative centre) by road. Pyankovo is the nearest rural locality.
