= Martely, Vereshchaginsky District, Perm Krai =

Martely Мартелы
- Village
- Location within Perm Krai Location within Russia
- Coordinates: 58°00′N 54°07′E
- Country: Russia
- Region: Perm Krai
- District: Vereshchaginsky District
- Time zone: UTC+5:00

Martely (Russian: Мартелы) is a rural locality (a village) in Vereshchaginsky District, Perm Krai, Russia. The population was 3 as of 2010.

== Geography ==
Martely is located 42 km west of Vereshchagino (the district's administrative centre) by road. Fedyashino is the nearest rural locality.
