= Borshchyovtsy =

Borshchyovtsy Борщовцы
- Village
- Location within Perm Krai Location within Russia
- Coordinates: 58°07′N 54°31′E
- Country: Russia
- Region: Perm Krai
- District: Vereshchaginsky District
- Time zone: UTC+5:00

Borshchyovtsy (Russian: Борщовцы) is a rural locality (a village) in Vereshchaginskoye Urban Settlement, Vereshchaginsky District, Perm Krai, Russia. The population was 68 as of 2010.

== Geography ==
Borshchyovtsy is located 4 km south of Vereshchagino (the district's administrative centre) by road. Ryabiny is the nearest rural locality.
