= Ryabiny =

Ryabiny Рябины
- Village
- Location within Perm Krai Location within Russia
- Coordinates: 58°03′N 54°39′E
- Country: Russia
- Region: Perm Krai
- District: Vereshchaginsky District
- Time zone: UTC+5:00

Ryabiny (Russian: Рябины) is a rural locality (a village) in Vereshchaginskoye Urban Settlement, Vereshchaginsky District, Perm Krai, Russia. The population was 647 as of 2010. There are 13 streets.

== Geography ==
Ryabiny is located 3 km south of Vereshchagino (the district's administrative centre) by road. Vereshchagino is the nearest rural locality.
