= Lukino, Vereshchaginsky District, Perm Krai =

Lukino Лукино
- Village
- Location within Perm Krai Location within Russia
- Coordinates: 58°04′N 54°15′E
- Country: Russia
- Region: Perm Krai
- District: Vereshchaginsky District
- Time zone: UTC+5:00

Lukino (Russian: Лукино) is a rural locality (a village) in Vereshchaginsky District, Perm Krai, Russia. The population was 26 as of 2010.

== Geography ==
Lukino is located 29 km west of Vereshchagino (the district's administrative centre) by road. Leushkanovo is the nearest rural locality.
