= Sivkovo =

Sivkovo may refer to:

- Sivkovo, Vereshchaginsky District
- Sivkovo, Vladimir Oblast
