= Kungur (inhabited locality) =

Kungur (Russian: Кунгур) is the name of several inhabited localities in Russia.

Urban localities

- Kungur, a town of the krai significance in Perm Krai

Rural localities

- Kungur, Vereshchaginsky District, Perm Krai, a village in Vereshchaginsky District of Perm Krai
- Kungur, Udmurt Republic, a village in Uvinsky District of the Udmurt Republic
