= Gudyri =

Gudyri Гудыри
- Village
- Location within Perm Krai Location within Russia
- Coordinates: 58°01′N 54°42′E
- Country: Russia
- Region: Perm Krai
- District: Vereshchaginsky District
- Time zone: UTC+5:00

Gudyri (Russian: Гудыри) is a rural locality (a village) in Vereshchaginsky District, Perm Krai, Russia. The population was 138 as of 2010. There are 4 streets.

== Geography ==
Gudyri is located 8 km southeast of Vereshchagino (the district's administrative centre) by road. Oshchepkovo is the nearest rural locality.
