= Volegi =

Volegi Волеги
- Village
- Location within Perm Krai Location within Russia
- Coordinates: 57°58′N 54°15′E
- Country: Russia
- Region: Perm Krai
- District: Vereshchaginsky District
- Time zone: UTC+5:00

Volegi (Russian: Волеги) is a rural locality (a village) in Vereshchaginsky District, Perm Krai, Russia. The population was 48 as of 2010.

== Geography ==
Volegi is located 34 km southwest of Vereshchagino (the district's administrative centre) by road. Nizhniye Garevskiye is the nearest rural locality.
