= Nizhniye Garevskiye =

Nizhniye Garevskiye Нижние Гаревские
- Village
- Location within Perm Krai Location within Russia
- Coordinates: 57°58′N 54°16′E
- Country: Russia
- Region: Perm Krai
- District: Vereshchaginsky District
- Time zone: UTC+5:00

Nizhniye Garevskiye (Russian: Нижние Гаревские) is a rural locality (a village) in Vereshchaginsky District, Perm Krai, Russia. The population was 16 as of 2010.

== Geography ==
Nizhniye Garevskiye is located 32 km southwest of Vereshchagino (the district's administrative centre) by road. Volegovo is the nearest rural locality.
