= Durovo, Vereshchaginsky District, Perm Krai =

Durovo Дурово
- Village
- Location within Perm Krai Location within Russia
- Coordinates: 58°13′N 54°41′E
- Country: Russia
- Region: Perm Krai
- District: Vereshchaginsky District
- Time zone: UTC+5:00

Durovo (Russian: Дурово) is a rural locality (a village) in Vereshchaginsky District, Perm Krai, Russia. The population was 44 as of 2010.

== Geography ==
Durovo is located 21 km north of Vereshchagino (the district's administrative centre) by road. Zakharyata is the nearest rural locality.
