= Kungur, Vereshchaginsky District, Perm Krai =

Kungur Кунгур
- Village
- Location within Perm Krai Location within Russia
- Coordinates: 58°03′N 54°59′E
- Country: Russia
- Region: Perm Krai
- District: Vereshchaginsky District
- Time zone: UTC+5:00

Kungur (Russian: Кунгур) is a rural locality (a village) in Vereshchaginsky District, Perm Krai, Russia. The population was 3 as of 2010.

== Geography ==
Kungur is located 26 km east of Vereshchagino (the district's administrative centre) by road. Pogorelka is the nearest rural locality.
