= Moskvyata, Vereshchaginsky District, Perm Krai =

Moskvyata Москвята
- Village
- Location within Perm Krai Location within Russia
- Coordinates: 58°05′N 54°55′E
- Country: Russia
- Region: Perm Krai
- District: Vereshchaginsky District
- Time zone: UTC+5:00

Moskvyata (Russian: Москвята) is a rural locality (a village) in Vereshchaginsky District, Perm Krai, Russia. The population was 11 as of 2010.

== Geography ==
Moskvyata is located 20 km east of Vereshchagino (the district's administrative centre) by road. Kozhevniki is the nearest rural locality.
