= Putino (passing loop) =

Putino Путино
- Passing loop
- Location within Perm Krai Location within Russia
- Coordinates: 58°02′N 54°27′E
- Country: Russia
- Region: Perm Krai
- District: Vereshchaginsky District
- Time zone: UTC+5:00

Putino (Russian: Путино) is a rural locality (a passing loop) in Vereshchaginsky District, Perm Krai, Russia. The population was 3 as of 2010.

== Geography ==
Putino is located 16 km west of Vereshchagino (the district's administrative centre) by road. Denisovka is the nearest rural locality.
