= 253rd Division =

253rd Division may refer to:

- 253rd Infantry Division, Wehrmacht, Germany
- 253rd Rifle Division, Soviet Union

== See also ==
- List of military divisions by number
