= Strizhi (inhabited locality) =

Strizhi (Russian: Стрижи) is the name of several inhabited localities in Russia.

== Urban localities ==
- Strizhi, Orichevsky District, Kirov Oblast, an urban-type settlement in Orichevsky District of Kirov Oblast

== Rural localities ==
- Strizhi, Kirovo-Chepetsky District, Kirov Oblast, a village in Pasegovsky Rural Okrug of Kirovo-Chepetsky District of Kirov Oblast
- Strizhi, Vereshchaginsky District, Perm Krai, a village in Vereshchaginsky District, Perm Krai
- Strizhi, Yusvinsky District, Perm Krai, a village in Yusvinsky District, Perm Krai
- Strizhi, Rostov Oblast, a settlement in Zelenolugskoye Rural Settlement of Martynovsky District of Rostov Oblast
