= Sivkovo, Vereshchaginsky District =

Sivkovo Сивково
- Village
- Location within Perm Krai Location within Russia
- Coordinates: 58°13′N 54°43′E
- Country: Russia
- Region: Perm Krai
- District: Vereshchaginsky District
- Time zone: UTC+5:00

Sivkovo (Russian: Сивково) is a rural locality (a village) in Vereshchaginsky District, Perm Krai, Russia. The population was 22 as of 2010.

== Geography ==
Sivkovo is located 22 km north of Vereshchagino (the district's administrative centre) by road. Zyukayka is the nearest rural locality.
