= Putino (selo) =

Putino Путино
- Selo
- Location within Perm Krai Location within Russia
- Coordinates: 58°04′N 54°17′E
- Country: Russia
- Region: Perm Krai
- District: Vereshchaginsky District
- Time zone: UTC+5:00

Putino (Russian: Путино) is a rural locality (a selo) and the administrative center of Putinskoye Rural Settlement, Vereshchaginsky District, Perm Krai, Russia. The population was 998 as of 2010. There are 16 streets.

== Geography ==
Putino is located 27 km west of Vereshchagino (the district's administrative centre) by road. Leushkanovo is the nearest rural locality.
