= Strizhi, Vereshchaginsky District, Perm Krai =

Strizhi Стрижи
- Village
- Location within Perm Krai Location within Russia
- Coordinates: 58°03′N 54°50′E
- Country: Russia
- Region: Perm Krai
- District: Vereshchaginsky District
- Time zone: UTC+5:00

Strizhi (Russian: Стрижи) is a rural locality (a village) in Vereshchaginsky District, Perm Krai, Russia. The population was 20 as of 2010.

== Geography ==
Strizhi is located 11 km east of Vereshchagino (the district's administrative centre) by road. Tyurikovo is the nearest rural locality.
