= Zakharyata =

Zakharyata Захарята
- Village
- Location within Perm Krai Location within Russia
- Coordinates: 58°13′N 54°42′E
- Country: Russia
- Region: Perm Krai
- District: Vereshchaginsky District
- Time zone: UTC+5:00

Zakharyata (Russian: Захарята) is a rural locality (a village) in Vereshchaginsky District, Perm Krai, Russia. The population was 169 as of 2010. There are 3 streets.

== Geography ==
Zakharyata is located 22 km north of Vereshchagino (the district's administrative centre) by road. Durovo is the nearest rural locality.
