= Strizhi =

Strizhi may refer to:

- Swifts (aerobatic team) (Strizhi), a Russian aerobatic performance demonstrator team
- Strizhi (inhabited locality), name of several inhabited localities in Russia
