= Schenkenländchen =

- Amt
- Map of Dahme-Spreewald highlighting Schenkenländchen
- Interactive map of Schenkenländchen
- Location within Germany Location within Brandenburg
- Coordinates: 52°08′N 13°37′E
- Country: Germany
- State: Brandenburg
- District: Dahme-Spreewald
- Seat: Teupitz
- Subdivisions: 6 municipalities

Area
  - Total: 289.09 km^{2} (111.62 sq mi)

Population (2025-12-31)
  - Total: 9,237
  - Density: 31.95/km^{2} (82.76/sq mi)
- Time zone: UTC+01:00 (CET)
  - Summer (DST): UTC+02:00 (CEST)
- Website: www.amt-schenkenlaendchen.de

Amt Schenkenländchen is an Amt ("collective municipality") in the district of Dahme-Spreewald, in Brandenburg, Germany. Its seat is in the town Teupitz. Its name is associated with the Schenk von Landsberg family.

The Amt Schenkenländchen consists of the following municipalities:

1. Groß Köris
2. Halbe
3. Märkisch Buchholz
4. Münchehofe
5. Schwerin
6. Teupitz

== Demography ==
Development of Population since 1875 within the Current Boundaries (Blue Line: Population; Dotted Line: Comparison to Population Development of Brandenburg state; Grey Background: Time of Nazi rule; Red Background: Time of Communist rule)

Recent Population Development and Projections (Population Development before Census 2011 (blue line); Recent Population Development according to the Census in Germany in 2011 (blue bordered line); Official projections for 2005-2030 (yellow line); for 2017-2030 (scarlet line); for 2020-2030 (green line)

Amt Schenkenländchen: Population development
within the current boundaries (2020)

Year	Pop.	±% p.a.
1875	6,383	—
1890	6,904	+0.52%
1910	9,618	+1.67%
1925	9,475	−0.10%
1939	11,094	+1.13%
1950	11,669	+0.46%
1964	10,061	−1.05%
1971	9,758	−0.44%
1981	8,654	−1.19%

Year	Pop.	±% p.a.
1985	8,399	−0.74%
1990	7,986	−1.00%
1995	7,978	−0.02%
2000	8,434	+1.12%
2005	8,417	−0.04%
2010	8,200	−0.52%
2015	8,737	+1.28%
2020	8,888	+0.34%
2025	9,237	+0.77%
