= 253rd Rifle Division =

253rd Rifle Division (July 10, 1941 – September 19, 1941) 253rd Rifle Division (October 9, 1941 – June 30, 1942) 253rd Rifle Division (August 1942 – July 1945)
- Active: 1941–1945
- Country: Soviet Union
- Branch: Red Army
- Type: Infantry
- Size: Division
- Engagements: Battle of Kiev (1941); Battle of Rostov (1941); Barvenkovo–Lozovaya offensive Second Battle of Kharkov; Battle of Demyansk; Battle of the Dniepr; Kalinkovichi-Mozyr offensive Ozarichi-Ptich offensive Parichi-Bobruisk offensive Lvov–Sandomierz offensive Vistula-Oder offensive Lower Silesian offensive Battle of Berlin; Battle of Halbe; Prague offensive
- Decorations: Order of the Red Banner; Order of Suvorov; Order of Kutuzov (all 3rd Formation)
- Battle honours: Kalinkovichi (3rd Formation)

Commanders
- Notable commanders: Col. Mikhail Aleksandrovich Kudryavtsev; Col. Aleksandr Ivanovich Fedoseev; Kombrig Aleksandr Andreevich Neborak; Lt. Col. Mikhail Grigorevich Grigorev; Maj. Gen. Anatolii Nikolaevich Rozanov; Maj. Gen. Efim Vasilevich Bedin; Col. Aleksandr Evstigneevich Filatov; Col. Ivan Georgievich Kantariya; Col. Efim Pavlovich Epin

The 253rd Rifle Division was formed in the Odessa Military District as a reserve infantry division of the Red Army about two weeks after the German invasion of the USSR. It was based on the shtat (table of organization and equipment) of April 5, 1941 with modifications due to the emergency. Although it was assigned to Southern Front in early August it was probably never completely formed, as its recruiting area was overrun by Army Group South in the first weeks of that month. The division was officially disbanded on September 19.

A new 253rd began forming in early October in the Kharkov Military District, probably incorporating elements of the 1st formation. As had occurred with the 1st formation its forming-up area was soon lost and the division was assigned to the reserves of Southwestern Front to complete the process. When a new 37th Army was created in Southern Front in mid-November the 253rd was one of its initially assigned units. The Army served as the Front's main assault force in the December counteroffensive that liberated Rostov-na-Donu and drove 1st Panzer Army back to the line of the Mius River. As the winter counteroffensive expanded the division advanced into what became a large salient based on Izium and Barvinkove south of Kharkiv. In May 1942, as Southwestern Front began an offensive toward that city, the 253rd was deep inside this salient as part of 6th Army and was hopelessly encircled in the German counteroffensive. It was destroyed late that month, but not officially disbanded until June 30.

The division was formed again in August, in the Volga Military District. Once formed it was moved north to the 11th Army of Northwestern Front and took part in the final stages of the Battle of Demyansk in 27th and 34th Armies of the same Front. After the Demyansk salient was evacuated the 253rd spent a couple of months vainly beating at the gates of Staraya Russa before moving to the Reserve of the Supreme High Command for an extended period and moving south. It re-entered the fighting front at the very end of the Belgorod–Kharkov offensive and was soon advancing with 40th Army across eastern Ukraine to the Dniepr River. In late September it was one of the first divisions to make a crossing, but ultimately the Bukryn bridgehead proved a dead end. Following the liberation of Kyiv it was moved north to join the 105th Rifle Corps of 65th Army in Belorussian Front (soon redesignated 1st Belorussian Front), and in fighting in Belarus in January 1944 it earned a battle honor. Following further battles in southeastern Belarus it was again removed to the Reserve of the Supreme High Command in March and moved south to join the 21st Rifle Corps in 3rd Guards Army, which soon came under command of 1st Ukrainian Front; it would remain under these commands for the duration. During the summer offensive the 253rd was awarded the Order of the Red Banner for its part in breaking the German defenses north of Lviv. When the Vistula-Oder offensive began in January 1945 the division, with its Corps, was in the Army's second echelon until it began to close on the Oder River in Silesia. It and its subunits won several decorations and honors for its role in crossing the Oder before taking part in the Lower Silesian Offensive, in which it helped isolate the German garrison of Glogau before advancing west to the Neisse River. The division remained along the line of this river until mid-April when the Berlin offensive began. The 253rd was instrumental in the encirclement and destruction of a German grouping near Cottbus, and then spent most of the rest of the campaign battling the encircled German 9th Army as it attempted to escape to the west. It was advancing on Prague at the time of the German surrender, and within months was disbanded.

== 1st Formation ==
The 253rd began forming on July 10 in the Kryvyi Rih area of Odessa Military District. Once formed the division was intended to have the following order of battle:

- 979th Rifle Regiment
- 981st Rifle Regiment
- 983rd Rifle Regiment
- 808th Artillery Regiment
- 540th Antiaircraft Battalion
- 346th Reconnaissance Company
- 551st Sapper Battalion
- 627th Signal Battalion
- 330th Medical/Sanitation Battalion
- 292nd Chemical Defense (Anti-gas) Company
- 715th Motor Transport Battalion
- 371st Field Bakery
- 679th Divisional Veterinary Hospital

Col. Mikhail Aleksandrovich Kudryavtsev took command of the division on the day it began forming and he would remain in this position for the duration of the 1st formation. In common with most of the divisions formed in this District in July and August it was desperately short of machine guns, heavy weapons, trucks, and basic communications gear; the absence of an antitank battalion is noteworthy. The 253rd officially reached the fighting front on August 5 and came under direct command of Southern Front, but was never assigned to an army. The situation was not improved when the 1st Panzer Group overran the Kryvyi Rih area on August 15, and although the division was identified at the front by German intelligence it was probably never completely formed. It was officially disbanded on September 19.

== 2nd Formation ==
A new 253rd began forming on October 6 at Volchansk in the Kharkov Military District. As it became part of the active front immediately it appears to have incorporated cadres of the 1st formation. Its order of battle was slightly different from the previous:

- 975th Rifle Regiment
- 981st Rifle Regiment
- 983rd Rifle Regiment
- 808th Artillery Regiment
- 327th Antitank Battalion
- 540th Antiaircraft Battalion
- 346th Reconnaissance Company
- 551st Sapper Battalion
- 627th Signal Battalion
- 330th Medical/Sanitation Battalion
- 292nd Chemical Defense (Anti-gas) Company
- 521st Motor Transport Battalion
- 363rd Field Bakery
- 767th Field Postal Station
- 1508th Field Office of the State Bank

Col. Aleksandr Ivanovich Fedoseev was appointed to command on October 9. Once again, the division's recruiting area was overrun as it assembled and by the end of the month it had been transferred to the reserves of Southwestern Front to finish forming. A new 37th Army was formed on November 15 in Southern Front and the 253rd was one of the initial units assigned to it.

=== Battle of Rostov ===
In mid-October the STAVKA, hard-pressed on the approaches to Moscow and with few available reserves, ordered the Southwestern and Southern Fronts to establish a new defense line along the Oskol, Northern Donets, and Mius rivers between October 17–30. In the event, Southern Front was able to established a stabilized line in defenses some 30–35 km west of this line.

On November 9 Marshal S. K. Timoshenko, commander of the Southwestern Direction as well as Southwestern Front, submitted proposals to the STAVKA to attack German concentrations in the Rostov area. Stalin and Marshal B. M. Shaposhnikov gave their general approval but made it clear that reinforcements could not be expected. Timoshenko therefore produced an operational plan in which 37th Army, his main assault force under command of Maj. Gen. A. I. Lopatin, was regrouped within Southern Front; his intention was to strike for the rear of 1st Panzer Group, with 18th and 9th Armies mounting supporting attacks. The offensive was timed for November 17 with a total of 22 rifle and nine cavalry divisions, plus five tank brigades.

As it turned out, due to the ground hardening as the freeze set in, Col. Gen. E. von Kleist, commander of 1st Panzer, had also selected November 17 for the resumption of his drive on Rostov. Meanwhile, Lopatin had formed up his divisions (150th, 216th, 253rd, 295th, 339th) in the Krasnodon area. The two sides indeed attacked almost simultaneously. The left flank divisions of 18th Army failed to register any success, 37th Army had to face increasing German resistance, and air support was grounded due to weather. III Panzer Corps burst into the northern suburbs of Rostov on November 19 and the city fell the next day. But the sweeping advance had opened a gap between 1st Panzer Army and 17th Army which Timoshenko seized upon to break into the rear of III Panzer.

The Soviet objective was now the liberation of Rostov and to strike for Taganrog later; 37th and 9th Armies would envelop III Panzer while 56th Army would strike Rostov itself from south of the Don River. III Panzer moved its 13th and 14th Panzer Divisions to the Tuslov sector to prevent 37th Army from breaking into its rear while 9th and 56th Armies crashed into its southern and eastern flanks; the latter established bridgeheads in the city by attacking over 1,000m of ice-bound river. On November 29 Rostov was liberated, the first major reverse suffered by the Wehrmacht during the campaign, but Hitler refused permission to withdraw to the Mius. In the end, the new commander of Army Group South, Field Marshal W. von Reichenau, persuaded Hitler that the withdrawal was essential to save 1st Panzer Army.

=== Barvenkovo–Lozovaya Offensive ===
On January 2, 1942 Colonel Fedoseev was replaced in command of the 253rd by Kombrig Aleksandr Andreevich Neborak. As indicated by his obsolete rank, this officer had been arrested and imprisoned during the Great Purge in March 1938. He was released in December 1939, after which he returned to his duties as a senior instructor at the Frunze Military Academy.

As the Soviet winter counteroffensive expanded from the vicinity of Moscow, Timoshenko proposed a plan to liberate the Donbas region with Southwestern and Southern Fronts. This was deemed impractical, and a revised plan saw Southern Front's three armies, including the 37th, attacking in the direction of Pavlograd. The 37th would drive through Krasnoarmeisk on Bolshoi Tokmak. The offensive began on January 18, and over the next four days the 6th and 57th Armies pushed some 32 km to the west, before being held at Balakliia. On January 24 Timoshenko introduced the 9th Army to operate between 37th and 57th Armies. On both sides of Izium the salient was expanded until Lozovaya was taken on the 27th. This marked the culmination of the offensive as German reserves arrived from Kharkiv.

== Second Battle of Kharkiv ==
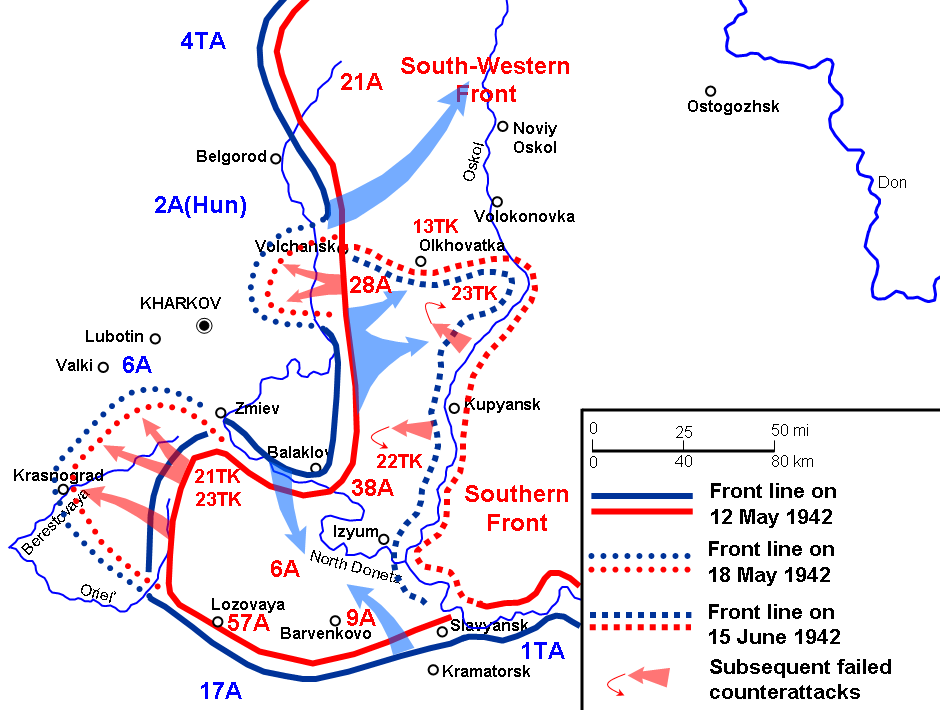
Second Battle of Kharkiv. Note the position of Soviet 6th Army (in red).

By the beginning of February the 253rd had been transferred to 38th Army in Southwestern Front, but in March it was moved again, now to 6th Army in the same Front. This Army was now located in the northwestern sector of the Izium-Barvinkove salient on the left flank of the Front. In Timoshenko's plan for the offensive, which began on May 12, two shock groups were to penetrate the German front and advance to encircle and recapture Kharkiv; the southern shock group consisted of the 6th Army and Army Group Bobkin to its left. Together the group had eight rifle and three cavalry divisions, plus 11 tank and two motorized rifle brigades and would advance on a 36 km-wide front. The 253rd was tasked with the capture of the strong German position at Verkhnyi Bishkin. On April 30 Kombrig Neborak was relieved of his command; he would commit suicide on May 4. He was replaced by Lt. Col. Mikhail Grigorevich Grigorev.

The offensive began at 0730 hours on May 12 following a 60-minute artillery preparation. Grigorev's troops, advancing from the division's left flank, penetrated the German defenses and routed units of the 62nd Infantry Division which were withdrawing to Verkhnyi Bishkin and Verkhniaya Bishkin. Leading units of the division reached these towns by the end of the day, but according to the plan they were to have been occupied. The next day the 253rd continued its effort to envelop the left flank of Verkhnyi Bishkin, with 41st Rifle Division pressing on the right, but the strongpoint continued to hold. The failure to clear the defenders delayed the commitment of the 21st and 23rd Tank Corps.

The fighting for Verkhnyi Bishkin continued through May 14 until the defenders were forced to abandon it late in the day under threat of encirclement. Meanwhile, Army Group Bobkin had broken through the Axis defenses west of the salient and was advancing toward Krasnohrad. The following day the southern shock group continued to advance but faced heavy air attacks which inflicted considerable losses and slowed the advance, especially of the tank corps. By the afternoon the 253rd had reached the Sukhaya Gomelsha River and was fighting for possession of the village of Bolshaya Gomelsha. In response to the offensive as a whole the 1st Panzer Army south of the salient began regrouping on May 16 for a counterstrike against 9th Army of Southern Front on the currently inactive south facing of the salient.

=== Operation Friderikus ===
On May 17 German air activity against the southern shock group declined significantly as it moved to support 1st Panzer's counterattack. As a result its two tank corps smashed Axis resistance and advanced as much as 15 km to the northwest. In turn, the rifle divisions were able to gain as much as 10 km. The 253rd, supported by the 37th Tank Brigade, cleared out the forest tract along the Northern Donets and reached the immediate vicinity of the town of Zmiiv. In the developing situation this was effectively sticking its head further into the noose. The German attack struck the boundary between the 341st and 106th Rifle Divisions, while on a second axis it hit the front of the 51st Rifle Division and the left flank of the 335th Rifle Division. By 0800 the 9th Army's defense had been penetrated to a depth of as much as 10 km. By noon this depth had increased to 20 km and the leading units of 14th Panzer Division were fighting along the southern outskirts of Barvinkove. Timoshenko reported to the STAVKA at 1730 that the German attack likely aimed "to secure the Barvenkovo, Izium region and attempt to cut off [our] offensive on Kharkov from the south."

Shortly after this, Lt. Gen. I. K. Bagramyan, Timoshenko's chief of staff, received intelligence from documents captured by 38th Army that German 6th Army was planning to attack the salient from the north as well. Despite Bagramyan's entreaties to act, Timoshenko limited himself to ordering the transfer of 21st Tank Corps and the 248th to restore 9th Army's defensive positions. Timoshenko was determined to continue the southern shock group's offensive. On May 18 Barvinkove was recaptured and Izium was under threat. At noon on May 19 Timoshenko finally accepted that, not only had his offensive failed, but the armies in the salient were faced with catastrophe.

==== Battle in Encirclement ====
Timoshenko ordered a regrouping at 1730 hours. The forces of the southern shock group were to go over to the defense. In addition he formed a new Army Group under command of his deputy commander, Lt. Gen. F. Ya. Kostenko, using the staff of former Army Group Bobkin for command and control. Group Kostenko consisted of all formations of Group Bobkin plus the 253rd, 41st and 266th Rifle Divisions, 5th Guards and 48th Tank Brigades, and part of 6th Army's artillery assets. It was ordered to assume the defense on May 20 along a front running from Zmiiv through Karavan and Krasnohrad to Sakhnovshchyna and to withdraw the main forces of 6th Cavalry Corps into the reserve. At the same time the Group was to employ a strong detachment to capture the Zmiiv region and crossings over the Donets in the Cheremushnaya region. In addition, 38th Army was to attack in the direction of Zmiiv to link up with Group Kostenko and destroy the German grouping in the Chuhuiv area.

The regrouping of Group Kostenko went on through the night of May 19/20, complicated by increased German activity and inefficient staff work. On May 21 German 6th Army began moving their 3rd and 23rd Panzer Divisions south from Kharkiv in preparation for its own counterblow to the south. During the afternoon Timoshenko continued to insist on the Chuhuiv operation even though the commander of 38th Army, Maj. Gen. K. S. Moskalenko, considered it "preposterous"; it was soon called off. 6th Army and 1st Panzer Army attacked from the north and south respectively on May 22 and in the late afternoon the trap slammed shut. At this time the 253rd was still deep in the northeastern corner of the pocket near Zmiiv.

Timoshenko now called for a concerted breakout to the west from the encircled salient by the combined remnants of 6th and 57th Armies. This was to link up with a relief force of 38th Army, which was to fight its way through German lines west of the Northern Donets. This force was slow to form and the plan came to nothing. Meanwhile the German forces were widening the corridor dividing the pocket from the main Soviet forces to as much as 25 km. During May 23 and 24 the encircled troops attacked the corridor in a desperate but more realistic aim of breaking out to the east. On May 24 the 253rd finally began to retreat, reaching around its start line on May 12. Meanwhile, the 23rd Panzer was threatening to get across its line of retreat. The next day General Kostenko divided his now-renamed Group "South", forming a shock group with three rifle divisions and most of his remaining mobile forces to effect a breakthrough of the German corridor, while the remainder, including the 253rd, were to defend a line from Glinishche through Verkhnyi Bishkin, Mironovka, and Pavlovka to Fyodorovka in order to protect the shock group from the south and southwest.

The breakout effort was to begin at dawn on May 25 but in the event did not start until 1000 hours and remained disorganized through the day. By the following afternoon the remaining Red Army forces were crowded into a 16 km-by-3 km pocket along the Bereka River valley; the remnants of the 253rd was withdrawing with 6th Cavalry Corps in the area of Mikhailovka under pressure from 23rd Panzer and the 113th Infantry Division. Through May 27–30 scattered individuals and small groups found their way through the German lines but organized resistance within the pocket had collapsed. The 253rd had already ceased to exist, but would not be officially disbanded until June 30.

== 3rd Formation ==
The final formation of the 253rd began on August 5 at Chapayevsk in the Volga Military District, based on the shtat of July 28. Once formed its order of battle was similar to the previous formations:

- 979th Rifle Regiment
- 981st Rifle Regiment
- 983rd Rifle Regiment
- 808th Artillery Regiment
- 327th Antitank Battalion
- 346th Reconnaissance Company
- 551st Sapper Battalion
- 627th Signal Battalion (later 211th Signal Company)
- 330th Medical/Sanitation Battalion
- 292nd Chemical Defense (Anti-gas) Company
- 521st Motor Transport Company
- 369th Field Bakery (later 363rd)
- 89th Divisional Veterinary Hospital
- 767th Field Postal Station
- 1508th Field Office of the State Bank

Maj. Gen. Anatolii Nikolaevich Rozanov was given command on the day the division began forming; he had previously led the 214th Rifle Division from late June to late August, 1941. In September it was assigned to the 4th Reserve Army in the Reserve of the Supreme High Command, and in October was assigned to Northwestern Front, before coming under command of 11th Army in November.

=== Battle of Demyansk ===
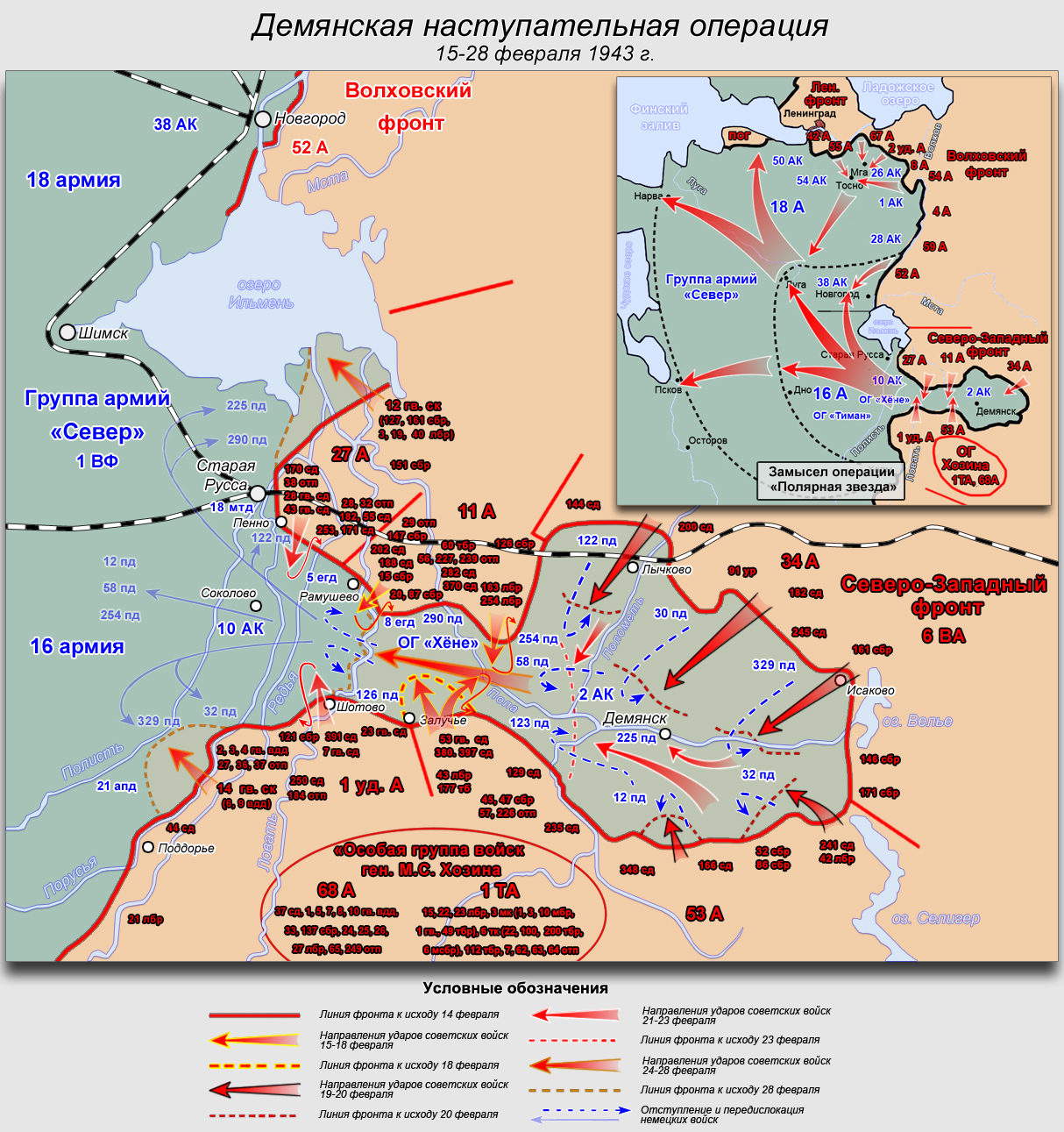
Soviet positions at Demyansk, spring 1943. The 253rd was in the 27th Army sector near Staraya Russa.

At this time Marshal Timoshenko was in command of Northwestern Front and was still attempting to close the Ramushevo corridor that linked II Army Corps in the Demyansk salient with its 16th Army. On November the 11th Army committed two rifle divisions, three rifle brigades and a tank brigade against the north side of the corridor while 1st Shock Army attacked from the south. As had happened in many previous attempts the Soviet forces were decimated as they struggled through minefields and barbed wire obstacles and made no more than minor gains. However, Army Gen. G. K. Zhukov, whose own Operation Mars was collapsing, ordered Timoshenko to continue attacking after a brief pause for regrouping. Throughout December his armies continued to jab at the German defenses with no greater success.

While it was apparent that 16th Army's defenses in the salient were still formidable, the encirclement of German 6th Army at Stalingrad changed everything. Despite the Ramushevo corridor the fact was that II Corps continued to rely heavily on air supply, and every transport aircraft was now needed in the south. Finally, when it was too late to affect the outcome at Stalingrad, on January 31, 1943 Hitler authorized the evacuation of the Demyansk and Rzhev salients. During that month the 253rd had been transferred to 27th Army, still in Northwestern Front. In the wake of Operation Iskra, which broke the German land blockade of Leningrad in January, Zhukov conceived a plan to encircle and destroy Army Group North: Operation Polar Star. The first phase of the overall operation would be yet another attempt to cut off and eliminate the Demyansk salient. Zhukov finalized his plan during the week preceding the planned attack date of February 15, and the 11th and 27th Armies together had nine rifle divisions, including the 253rd, plus 150 tanks, massed between Penno and Ramushevo against the 5th Jäger Division, but the difficulties of logistics meant the 27th needed another week to redeploy. The piecemeal Soviet attacks were repulsed with heavy losses and Polar Star collapsed. Operation Ziethen began on February 17 before the delayed Soviet attack could get fully underway; Demyansk was abandoned on February 21 and by February 26 most of the corridor was evacuated as well.

Ziethen freed up sufficient German forces to reinforce their positions at Staraya Russa and along the Lovat River. Northwestern Front made several attempts to liberate this town over the coming months but all were unsuccessful and it would hold out until February 18, 1944. The 253rd was transferred to 34th Army of the Front in April, but on May 12 it was moved to 52nd Army in the Reserve of the Supreme High Command for rebuilding and redeployment to the south. It spent an extended period in the Reserve, not returning to the fighting front until August 25, as part of 47th Rifle Corps in 40th Army of Voronezh Front.

From December 1942 until its return to the front the division underwent several changes in command, as summarized:

- Maj. Gen. Serafim Grigorevich Shtykov - December 21 to December 30, 1942
- Col. Georgii Grigorevich Voronin - December 31, 1942 to January 17, 1943 (severely wounded)
- Maj. Gen. Mikhail Nikitich Kleshnin - January 17 to January 18, 1943
- Col. Ivan Petrovich Petrov - January 18 to February 27, 1943
- Maj. Gen. Efim Vasilevich Bedin - February 27 - October 4, 1943

Bedin had previously led the 126th Rifle Division in 1941 and the 7th Guards Rifle Division through nearly all of 1942 and into 1943.

== Into Ukraine ==
40th Army, under command of General Moskalenko, had been taking part in Operation Polkovodets Rumyantsev since it began on August 3. By the time the 253rd arrived the Army had nearly finished the fighting around Okhtyrka, and, in fact, the city was liberated on August 25. At this point 40th Army was poised to advance through eastern Ukraine.

=== Battle of the Dniepr ===
On September 20, as the Army was approaching the Dniepr River, the division was noted as being among its strongest, with 5,035 personnel, 55 medium and 19 heavy mortars, ten regimental guns, 19 76mm cannon and 12 122mm howitzers. On the morning of September 23 Moskalenko addressed combat orders nos. 897 and 898 to the commanders of his 47th and 52nd Rifle Corps in which he wrote: "The Dnepr River must be forced in the most favorable places, without regard for boundary lines and available crossing equipment."

That morning the 253rd was on the right bank of the Dniepr, facing south toward the village of Khodorov on a fordable section of the river. This was just west of the village of Velykyi Bukryn, which gave its name to the bridgehead that would be formed over the coming days. General Bedin led the crossing operation, for which he would be made a Hero of the Soviet Union on October 23. Another hero of the crossing was Sen. Sailor Alexei Ivanovich Golovkin, who was attached to the division from the Red Navy. As a reconnaissance officer of the 346th Reconnaissance Battalion he crossed with 13 scouts under command and was soon engaged with up to a company of German soldiers. Golovkin's group, reduced to just four unwounded men, held out until reinforced. Golovkin was severely wounded and evacuated. He was made a Hero of the Soviet Union on October 29, but was discharged due to his disability in July 1944. He went on to graduate from the Leningrad Naval School and worked as a sea captain around the port, before his death in 1983. Overall the crossing went slowly and consisted of infantry only, without supporting heavy weapons.

==== Bukryn Bridgehead ====
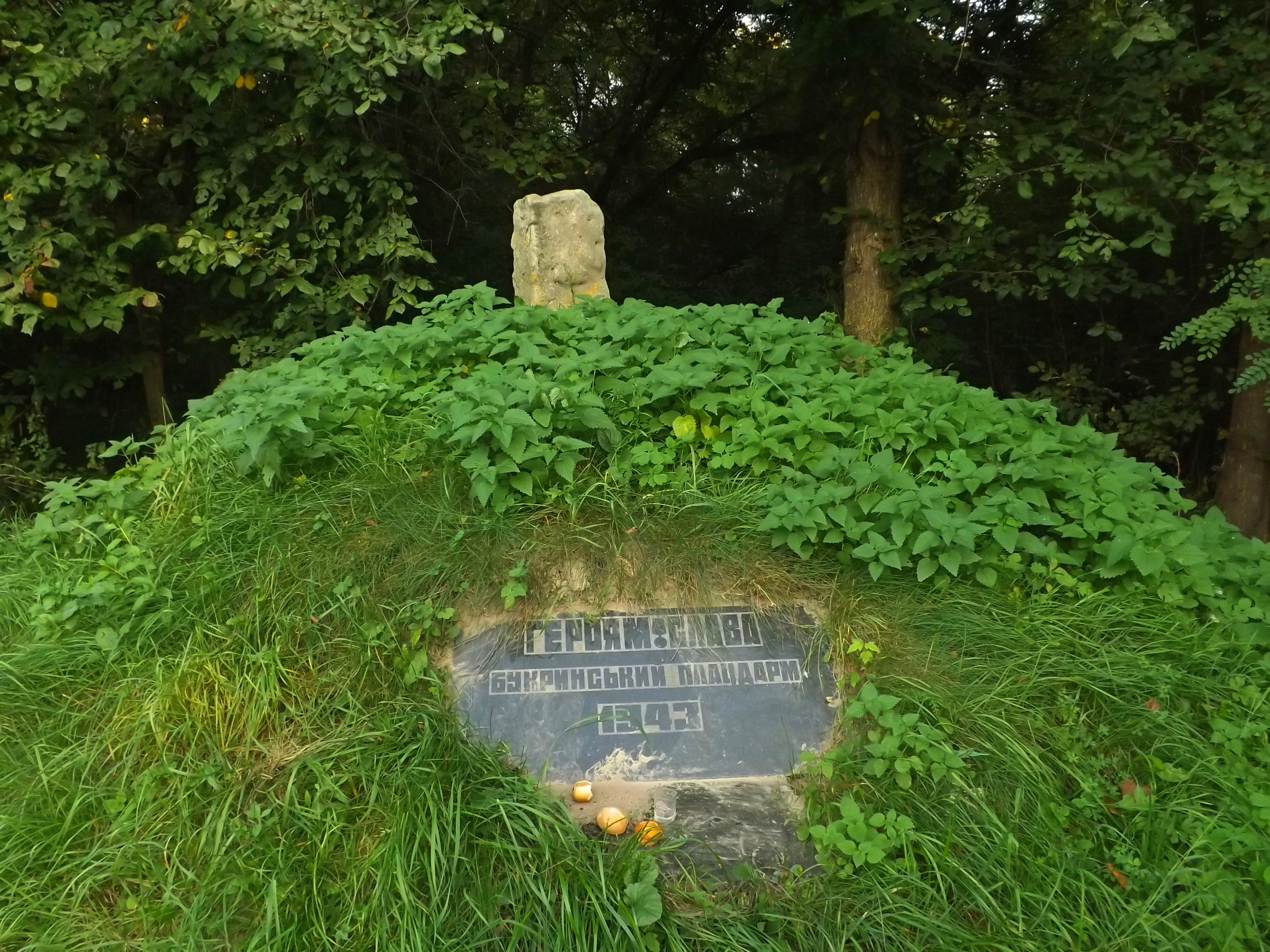
Memorial for the Bukryn Bridgehead

By the end of September 29 the 161st, 253rd and 337th Rifle Divisions of 47th Corps, along with the 8th Guards Tank Corps of 40th Army, two rifle divisions of 27th Army, and the motorized infantry of 3rd Guards Tank Army's 7th Guards Tank and 9th Mechanized Corps were fighting in the Bukryn bridgehead, which was now 11 km across and 6 km deep. The next day most of these forces, including the 253rd, went over to the offensive in accordance with Front directive No. 0043/op but encountered fierce resistance through organized fire and counterattacks. By the end of the day the bridgehead force had not only failed to reach its objectives, but in places there themselves pushed back somewhat, although contact was made with the smaller bridgehead at Hryhorivka. This was blamed on lack of overall leadership within the bridgehead and consequent disorganization; most of the higher headquarters were still on the left bank. It was not until the night of October 1/2 that the bridgehead was divided into two parts. In addition, the rough terrain was not favorable to the armored forces. On October 4 General Bedin left his command to Col. Grigorii Fyodorovich Shcherbakov, but returned on October 7. On October 10 the division's personnel strength was reported as 4,830, with 70 mortars, ten regimental guns, 18 76mm cannon and ten 122mm howitzers.

During October 6–11 a period of quiet settled over the entire front from Rzhyshchiv to Kaniv as Voronezh Front prepared to resume the offensive. The number of bridges and ferries over the Dniepr had increased considerably since the start of the month. 40th Army was to launch its main attack along the left flank with 47th Corps and by the end of the first day capture the line Staiki–Zikrachi–Yanivka; 52nd Corps was to assist in the attack in the Khodorov area. The 253rd was in 47th Corps' first echelon along with the 161st and 337th and each of the first two divisions were to be supported by 12 tanks of 10th Tank Corps. The 42nd Guards Rifle Division was the Corps' second echelon. The assault began on October 12 with a 40-minute artillery preparation at 0700 hours. Despite the powerful artillery and air attacks, including 1,054 sorties by 2nd Air Army, from the very beginning the defenders put up stubborn resistance. Poor reconnaissance meant that much of the preparation was wasted. Despite this, during the day's fighting the 47th Corps advanced 8 km along the main axis, and the village of Khodorov was finally taken. However, the German defense had not been fully penetrated and counterattacks continued on all axes. Fierce fighting continued through the night.

At 1700 hours on October 12 the Front commander, Army Gen. N. F. Vatutin, had issued an order to continue the offensive from 0800 the next day. 40th Army was ordered to capture Rzhyshchiv and reach a line from that place to Yanivka. The attack was preceded by a 15-minute fire onslaught, but the Front's forces made no gains at all, and lost ground in a few places. The previous day's advance had significantly increased the range to their targets for Soviet artillery still located on the left bank. On October 14 the 42nd Guards was committed to the fighting, but had no greater success. The next day several efforts were made to continue the offensive at several times and locations but only the 42nd Guards enjoyed an insignificant local success, as the 11th Panzer Division completed its concentration in the Tulintsy arera. At 1040 on October 16 Vatutin ordered a suspension of the offensive.

Four days later his Front was redesignated as 1st Ukrainian. By October 23 Vatutin had changed his plan to focus all his Front's efforts on the sectors held by 40th Army and the right flank of 27th Army, but this was cancelled by the STAVKA late on October 24; it had concluded that further efforts to break out of the Bukryn bridgehead would be futile, largely owing to the difficult terrain. A new offensive was planned to begin on November 3 with the intention to advance instead from the Lyutezh bridgehead north of Kyiv. 40th Army was committed to a pinning attack out of the bridgehead on November 1; this diversion began with 40 minutes of artillery and airstrikes and 47th Corps was able to take the village of Kanada. The fighting continued into November 5 and achieved little more than drawing the 2nd SS Panzer Division out of reserve but by the next day it was clear that Kyiv was about to be liberated from Lyutezh and the 40th and 27th Armies were ordered to maintain the impression of a coming attack with false troop concentrations and dummy tanks. On the night of November 11/12 the headquarters of 47th Corps was withdrawn from the Bukryn bridgehead to the left bank along with the 253rd and 68th Guards Rifle Division, with the intention that they would recross in the Kailov area. General Bedin had left the division on November 10 to take command of 21st Rifle Corps which he would lead until he was seriously wounded in July 1944. He was replaced by Col. Aleksandr Evstigneevich Filatov. By the beginning of December the division was in the reserves of 1st Ukrainian Front, but by the start of the new year it was part of 65th Army's 105th Rifle Corps in Belorussian Front.

== Battles in Belarus ==
65th Army was under command of Lt. Gen. P. I. Batov, and 105th Corps came under his command from Front reserves just after January 1. The Front commander, Army Gen. K. K. Rokossovskii, was planning a new offensive against German 2nd Army to seize Mazyr and Kalinkavichy with his 65th and 61st Armies in accordance with a STAVKA directive of January 2:

Begin an offensive with the forces on the front's left wing, defeat the enemy's Kalinkovichi-Mozyr' grouping, and subsequently attack toward Bobruisk and Minsk... The 12th Panzer and 251st Infantry Divisions, and also units from the enemy's XX Army Corps, were operating against 65th Army. The forward edge of the enemy's defense extended from Kazansk through Terebnia and Kholodniki to Viazovitsa.

Rokossovskii was reinforced with the 1st Guards Tank Corps to spearhead 65th Army's advance, as well as the 2nd and 7th Guards Cavalry Corps, which were ideally suited to leading 61st Army through the swampy terrain along the Pripyat River.

=== Kalinkavichy-Mazyr Offensive ===
Rokossovskii ordered Batov to conduct his main attack in the roughly 15 km-wide sector extending from the Ipa River north of Kalinkavichy to Viazovitsa northeast of the city using two of his rifle corps and a supporting attack in the Novosichi area with a single corps. Batov designated the 105th and 18th Rifle Corps for the main blow against defenses manned by LVI Panzer Corps. The two rifle corps were to penetrate the first German defensive belt on January 8 and 9 and then support the commitment of 1st Guards Tanks. Maj. Gen. D. F. Alekseev, commander of the 105th, deployed his 132nd and 75th Guards Rifle Divisions in first echelon with the 253rd in second. The Corps would be supported by the 255th Tank Regiment, 2nd Guards Tank Brigade, plus the 1816th and 1888th Self-Propelled Artillery Regiments, both of which were equipped with SU-76s.

However, as is so often the case, the original plan did not survive the first day of combat. Overnight on October 5/6 the 5th Panzer Division withdrew 10 km from its forward defenses in the swampy Novosichi area. This forced Alekseev's Corps to advance its lines and regroup its forces before launching its assault, which began at 0940 hours on January 8, 10 minutes before the artillery completed its 40-45 minute preparation. However, the 105th and 18th Corps immediately encountered fierce German resistance, and the attacks faltered after just minimal gains. The 75th Guards, for example, had no success and remained in its jumping-off positions. Batov proposed to commit his 1st Guards Tanks, but Rokossovskii realized it was both premature and dangerous to do so. The fighting on January 9 saw much the same results, but in the afternoon Batov ordered the tankers to enter the battle; this was countermanded by Rokossovskii several minutes later. On the evening of January 10 he called a conference at Batov's command post, which included officers of 61st Army as well:

He said that the unsuccessful beginning of the operation was the result of the forces' stereotypical actions. Each day an artillery preparation was conducted, and then the infantry went over to the offensive accompanied by a considerable number of direct support infantry tanks. In addition, the attack line was located too far from the enemy, and, moving through deep snow, quite naturally the infantry lagged behind the tanks.

He now proposed a change in tactics and the direction of the main attack. 1st Guards Tanks was to attack in the first echelon of 65th Army on the morning of January 11 from Martynovichi to 3 km northwest of Terebnia. It was to be supported by the entire 4th Artillery Penetration Corps, dedicated formations of 16th Air Army, and the divisions of 18th and 105th Corps. The tanks were to penetrate the German defenses, advance along the Nizhne-Kozlovichi, Koshchichi and Turovichi axis, and capture Kalinkavichy by an assault from the northwest.

Overnight on January 10/11 an extensive regrouping took place. Snowy weather forced cancellation of the air support, but the artillery preparation began at noon, this time only long enough for the tanks to reach the forward German trenches. A second wave with assault infantry began moving forward a minute later. The first wave raised up a whirlwind of snowflakes, screening the second wave from observation. The infantry was soon involved in hand-to-hand combat in the trenches. The German defenses collapsed, unleashing an irresistible tide of riflemen, tanks and self-propelled guns. The weather improved by 1500 hours, allowing up to 60 aircraft to strike German positions at Domanovichi and Anisovichi and break up a planned counterattack. By the end of the day 1st Guards Tanks had advanced 15–18 km with the rifle divisions close behind, although the 253rd remained in second echelon.

The advance went on through the night as the hard-pressed German forces attempted to escape from partial encirclement and take up new defenses along the Ipa. Early on January 13 Batov issued orders that the final assault on Kalinkavichy would be made by 1st Guards Tanks and 105th Corps from the north. The attack began at first light against diminishing German resistance. The two panzer divisions were moving on the Ipa with 18th Corps in pursuit and XX Corps was in the process of abandoning both Kalinkavichy and Mazyr. By noon the 1st Guards Tanks had captured the fortified strongpoints at Kolbasichi and Slobodka, just 5 km northwest of Kalinkavichy. The advance halted here briefly in the face of heavy fire from German rearguards. Airstrikes hit German artillery as the infantry of 105th Corps caught up with the armor. By now the 253rd had joined its corps-mates, supporting the tankers until they reached the outskirts after which it wheeled westward toward the Ipa with the 75th Guards. At 0400 hours of January 14 the tanks entered the northern outskirts along with the 132nd Division to learn the last of the German troops had withdrawn. They linked up with 61st Army's 12th Guards Rifle Division which had just entered the city from the east. The same day the 253rd was given a battle honor:

KALINKOVICHI... 253rd Rifle Division (Colonel Filatov, Aleksandr Evstigneevich)... The troops who participated in the liberation of Mozyr and Kalinkovichi, by the order of the Supreme High Command of 14 January 1944, and a commendation in Moscow, are given a salute of 20 artillery salvoes from 224 guns.

Rokossovskii now ordered Batov to begin the second stage of the offensive.

==== Ozarichi-Ptich Offensive ====
Rokossovskii was still operating under the STAVKA directive of January 2. The 65th and 61st Armies were now to penetrate the German defenses along the Ipa and, in conjunction with 48th Army to the north, capture Ozarichi and Mikhnovichi, advance to secure bridgeheads over the Ptich River, and continue the offensive toward Babruysk. After a short pause to regroup and refit, the 65th and 48th Armies were to begin operations on the morning of January 16. Batov's forces were to start on a 25 km-wide sector along the Ipa from Kaplichi northeastward to the Koreni region, 10 km east of Ozarichi; the 27th, 19th and 18th Rifle Corps would be in first echelon, while the 105th was in second echelon in the Kholodniki region. His Army faced the weak 707th Security Division on LVI Panzer Corps' extended left wing. The 105th was to reinforce the 19th and 18th Corps whenever and wherever required. As the 1st Guards Tanks had been withdrawn for rest and refitting the 65th Army would have only negligible armor support.

Overnight on January 15/16 the 19th Rifle Corps began a stealthy advance across the Ipa, penetrating the positions of 707th Security, which had just been reinforced by battalion groups from the 35th Infantry Division. Elements of 82nd Rifle Division seized the village of Novoselki after a see-saw battle and the remaining defenders withdrew westward through heavily forested swampland. The Corps continued to exploit on January 17 and the 707th was soon scattered to the winds. The 27th Corps exploited this success by pushing westward 3–5 km toward Ozarichi. By the end of January 19 two of its divisions, probably reinforced by the 253rd which was in the 105th Corps' first echelon, reached positions extending from the eastern approaches to Syshchichi, 5 km south of Ozarichi, northeastward past the eastern approaches of Ozarichi to Zabolote, 10 km northeast of Ozarichi, already in the hands of 38th Guards Rifle Division.

After a regrouping and a pause to bring up artillery and ammunition, the three forward Corps of 65th Army resumed their general advance on the morning of January 20. The 82nd Division captured Visha, 19th Corps took Berezniaki, and to the right the 253rd, temporarily attached to 27th Corps, joined the 354th Rifle Division in fighting its way into Ozarichi's eastern suburbs into the following day, but they were unable to drive the defending 35th Infantry from the town's western outskirts. By the end of January 22, Rokossovskii's forces had torn a 12 km-deep and 15 km-wide hole in the German defenses between the 2nd Army and the 9th Army, and there was virtually nothing either could do to restore their fronts. He now ordered Batov to use every resource to crack open the remaining German defenses at Ozarichi and Savichi.

In order to maintain his success, Rokossovskii directed Belov to form forward detachments and ski detachments in all his first echelon divisions and infiltrate them deeply into the German rear areas. This began overnight on January 21/22. From then until January 25 the 65th and 61st Armies continued pounding the defenses of the two German armies' defenses from Ozarichi to Krotov. The 35th Infantry's positions in and north of the former were repeatedly assaulted, but gains were minimal. Rokossovskii now created a new shock group at the junction of the 65th's 18th and 19th Corps to strike northwestward toward Kriukhovichi and Savin Rog. To ensure success this group was reinforced with a second echelon made up of the three divisions of 105th Corps. The renewed offensive had mixed results, but by January 28 the 253rd and 132nd Divisions were approaching Savin Rog after a gain of 6 km and were engaging the lead elements of 110th Infantry Division. The 110th contained the Soviet advance, but its counterattacks to close the gap between the two German armies were unsuccessful. Batov now spread out his forces to widen the gap. The 253rd and 132nd, plus the 75th Guards, which had been held as the Army reserve, reinforced the 19th Corps to advance eastward and westward and seize ground north of Savichi and Syshchichi to the west. Given its untenable position, 4th Panzer Division had no choice but to withdraw from Savichi on February 4.

==== Parichi-Bobruisk offensive ====
During the course of this fighting the 253rd received 1,500 replacements from the 2nd Training Regiment, as well as 500 penal replacements from the "Sverdlovsk Camps". Shtraf personnel were usually military criminals (deserters, etc.), but as Sverdlovsk Oblast was a long way from the front these men probably came from the Gulag camps in the Urals. While 48th and part of 65th Armies continued to advance the 105th Corps remained in the Ozarichi area until February 26 when it began to shift to the north. On the 17th, Belorussian Front had been split, with the part remaining under Rokossovskii's command being redesignated as 1st Belorussian Front. Throughout March the 65th continued to fight local battles to improve its positions, but on March 12 the 253rd returned to the Reserve of the Supreme High Command for rebuilding and redeployment. It was assigned to 3rd Guards Army's 21st Rifle Corps, still under command of General Bedin, and these formations were in turn assigned to 1st Ukrainian Front in April. The division would remain under these commands for the duration of the war.

== Into Western Ukraine and Poland ==
Colonel Filatov left the division on May 23 and was replaced the next day by Col. Ivan Georgievich Kantariya. At the beginning of July the 21st Corps contained the 253rd, plus the 81st and 136th Rifle Divisions.

=== Lvov–Sandomierz Offensive ===
In preparation for the summer offensive into Poland the 3rd Guards Army was positioned on the right (north) flank of 1st Ukrainian Front and 21st Corps was on the Army's center-left, facing positions of the XXXXII Army Corps southwest of Lutsk. 21st Corps had its 136th and 253rd Divisions in first echelon with the 81st Division in reserve. By July 10 the Front command had received information about possible German withdrawals from several vulnerable sectors prior to the main offensive. In response all first echelon divisions were to form reconnaissance detachments of reinforced rifle companies to begin combat operations at 2200 hours on July 12, continuing until 0100 hours on the 13th. The reconnaissance confirmed that the main German forces facing 3rd Guards and the right flank of 13th Army were pulling back under cover of rearguards.

At 0300 the Army's forward battalions went over to the attack and during the day the 21st Corps advanced as much as 15 km in an energetic pursuit supported by armor and air attacks. The assault continued at 0515 hours on July 14 following a 30-minute artillery preparation. The next day at 0800 hours the Army began to penetrate the second German defensive belt; 21st Corps was now encountering much stiffer resistance and had to beat off several counterattacks as it slowly moved forward, gaining up to 3 km during the day. This line, anchored on the Luha River, was eventually forced and by the end of July 18 the Corps reached the city of Volodymyr-Volynskyi, which was liberated two days later. A pursuit to the Vistula began on July 28. On August 9 the 253rd would be presented with the Order of the Red Banner for breaking through the German defenses in the Lviv direction.

=== Vistula-Oder Offensive ===
Colonel Kantariya departed his command on September 18 and was replaced two days later by Col. Efim Pavlovich Epin. This officer had previously served as chief of staff of the 76th Rifle Corps and for about six months in late 1943 as its acting commander. At the beginning of the new year the 21st Corps comprised the 253rd, 58th and 329th Rifle Divisions. 3rd Guards Army was under command of Col. Gen. V. N. Gordov. When the offensive began on January 12 the Corps was in the Army's second echelon. It remained in this position until the Army began approaching the Oder River on January 28; this river and the Silesian industrial area were the immediate objectives of the Front. By the end of January the 3rd Guards Army had all three of its Corps deployed in a single echelon and was attacking along a sector 70 km wide. The 21st and 120th Corps were overcoming the resistance of German 9th Army, which was falling back to the southwest under pressure of the 1st Belorussian Front. 21st Corps was now committed to encircle a German grouping in the area of Guhrau in cooperation with the 76th Corps. In the course of three days this grouping of 15,000 troops was defeated, with many forced to surrender. By this time most of the rifle divisions involved in the offensive averaged about 5,500 personnel each.

== Into Germany ==
The commander of the Front, Marshal I. S. Konev, issued a new operational order on January 31 which stated in part:

On 6 February the front's armies are to go over to a decisive offensive, will launch their main attack in the general direction of Sprottau, Cottbus and Jüterbog, with the task of defeating the enemy's Breslau group of forces and by 25 February reaching the Elbe River with their main forces.

The Front's right wing armies (3rd Guards, 13th, 52nd and 6th, plus 3rd Guards and 4th Tank Armies) would form a shock group concentrated along a 66 km front from Keben to Malcz. 3rd Guards Army, along with the 25th Tank Corps and the 17th Breakthrough Artillery Division, was to deploy its main forces in a bridgehead across the Oder northwest of Keben and was to attack in the direction of Freistadt, Gubben and Trebbin on a 8 km breakthrough sector.

=== Lower Silesian Offensive ===
Due to supply and weather difficulties, the offensive began at 0930 hours on February 8 after a 50-minute artillery preparation. Weather conditions prevented significant air support. 3rd Guards' shock group attacked along the entire sector from the Oder to Klein Grafon. During the day it advanced into the German defense up to 7 km while also fending off numerous counterattacks. However, this pace was only half of what was expected. Despite this, by dusk the Front's shock group had broken through the German main defensive zone on the left bank of the Oder along three axes. The next day the fighting broke out again with new strength. 3rd Guards Army continued to attack, against resistance, to the northwest, rolling up the German lines along the river; elements of the 21st and 76th Corps, actively assisted by 25th Tanks, advanced 6 km during the day. Part of 21st Corps, in conjunction with 120th Corps along their mutual flanks, reached the area north of Glogau. Having crushed the resistance of units of 72nd Infantry and 16th Panzer Divisions, they reached the approaches to the city from the north. Retreating German units, with the assistance of arriving reinforcements from Glogau, managed to consolidate in the Zerbau area. The fighting along this line became protracted.

On February 10 the German forces continued to put up fierce resistance in an effort to hold the fortress area of Glogau and Breslau, often counterattacking and bringing up additional forces. While 120th Corps advanced north of Glogau, the remainder of 3rd Guards Army's shock force continued to roll up the German defense along the Oder, bypassing the Glogau area from the south. However, Konev continued to urge Gordov to speed up the defeat of the Glogau grouping and vigorously advance toward the Bóbr River. The next day Gordov began carrying out this assignment, and the fiercest fighting unfolded in the Glogau area. Despite desperate German efforts the 3rd Guards Army persistently threw them out of one inhabited locale after another and by the end of the day units of 21st Corps had outflanked the city from the north, east and south. A retreat route remained open, but was already threatened with being cut by the Army's left flank formations. It was clear that the garrison at Glogau was not preparing to abandon the place and was trying to distract to itself as many Soviet troops as possible.

Insofar as Glogau was heavily fortified the battle for its capture might have stretched out for a long time and tie down significant forces. Thus the decision was made to encircle it and leave behind the 329th Rifle Division to blockade the fortress while the remaining forces of the Army's shock group continued the offensive. The remainder of 21st Corps, with the 25th Tanks, completed cutting off the Glogau garrison before continuing to advance westward to roll up the defense along the Oder beginning on February 12.

Following the defeat and encirclement of XXIV Panzer Corps in the Glogau area the pace of 3rd Guards Army's advance began to increase rapidly because the Corps' remnants began falling back hurriedly, putting up little resistance. By February 15 the entire bend of the Oder had been cleared of German forces, and 3rd Guards, having captured the towns of Grossen and Naumburg, had reached the Bóbr from its mouth to Naumburg. The arrival of the Army at the Bóbr significantly improved the situation along the right flank of the Front's main shock group. The width of the Army's attack front sank from 104 km to 36 km.

By February 16 the line of the Bóbr and Kweis rivers was being defended by three corps of 4th Panzer Army. XXXX Panzer Corps faced the 3rd Guards Army. According to Konev's plan for the next phase of the offensive the Front's main group of forces, including 3rd Guards, was to reach the Neisse River, capture bridgeheads on the west bank, and securely consolidate along the line reached. 21st Corps had secured a small bridgehead over the Bóbr on the night of February 15/16 along a bridge the defenders have failed to blow in the area southwest of Grossen. During the day one division of the Corps forced the river in the Bobersberg area and broke into the town from the march. At about the same time the right flank units of 76th Corps forced another crossing, which soon linked up with the 21st Corps' division, creating a shallow bridgehead more than 10 km wide. In the afternoon the German command scrambled to bring up forces to counterattack this lodgement, but this was unsuccessful.

On orders from Konev, Gordov launched his following attack along his Army's right wing to make use of the Grossen–Guben paved road. By the end of the day the 120th Corps had been brought up to the 21st Corps attack sector, followed by the 25th Tanks. On the morning of the 17th the tankers, in cooperation with units of 21st Corps, crushed the resistance of the "Matterstock" Special Designation Division and advanced 12 km toward Guben and on February 18 seized the Forstadt suburb. During these two days the remainder of the Corps was engaged in stubborn fighting for several towns and villages, including Neuendorf and Merzwise while fighting continued for Lindenheim. Altogether as a result of the fighting during February 15–20 the 3rd Guards Army had crushed German resistance along the Bóbr and reached the Neisse with its right flank along a 10 km sector.

On the 20th, Colonel Epin was wounded and hospitalized. He was replaced the next day by Col. Vadim Artyomevich Erigov, who was in turn replaced on February 25 by Col. Halim Nasibulin. Maj. Gen. Emilyan Ivanovich Vasilenko took over on March 3 and remained in command until Epin returned on April 13, the eve of the Berlin offensive. Just before this, on April 5 the division was decorated with the Order of Kutuzov, 2nd Degree, for its role in the capture of Striegau, Sprottau, and several other lower Silesian towns. The 979th Rifle and 808th Artillery Regiments had earlier been awarded the honorific "Oder", but were now awarded the Order of Alexander Nevsky and the Order of Bogdan Khmelnitsky, 2nd Degree, respectively, while the 983rd Regiment also received the Bogdan Khmelnitsky and the 981st was given the Order of the Red Star, all for their parts in the fighting for Sorau and two other places. On the same date the following were awarded for crossing the Oder northwest of Breslau: 981st and 983rd Rifle (Order of Alexander Nevsky); 327th Antitank Battalion (Order of the Red Star)

=== Berlin Operation ===
At the start of the Berlin offensive the 3rd Guards Army was deployed on the east bank of the Neisse along a 28 km front from Groß Gastrose to Klein Bademüsel. The 329th Division had rejoined 21st Corps and the Corps was grouped along the axis of the main attack with the three divisions of 120th Corps. The main attack would be launched along the Army's left wing, forcing the river on a 9 km sector from outside Forst to outside Klein Bademüsel. The 21st Corps had the 253rd and 329th in first echelon and the 58th Division in second echelon. The Army's second echelon consisted of 25th Tank Corps.

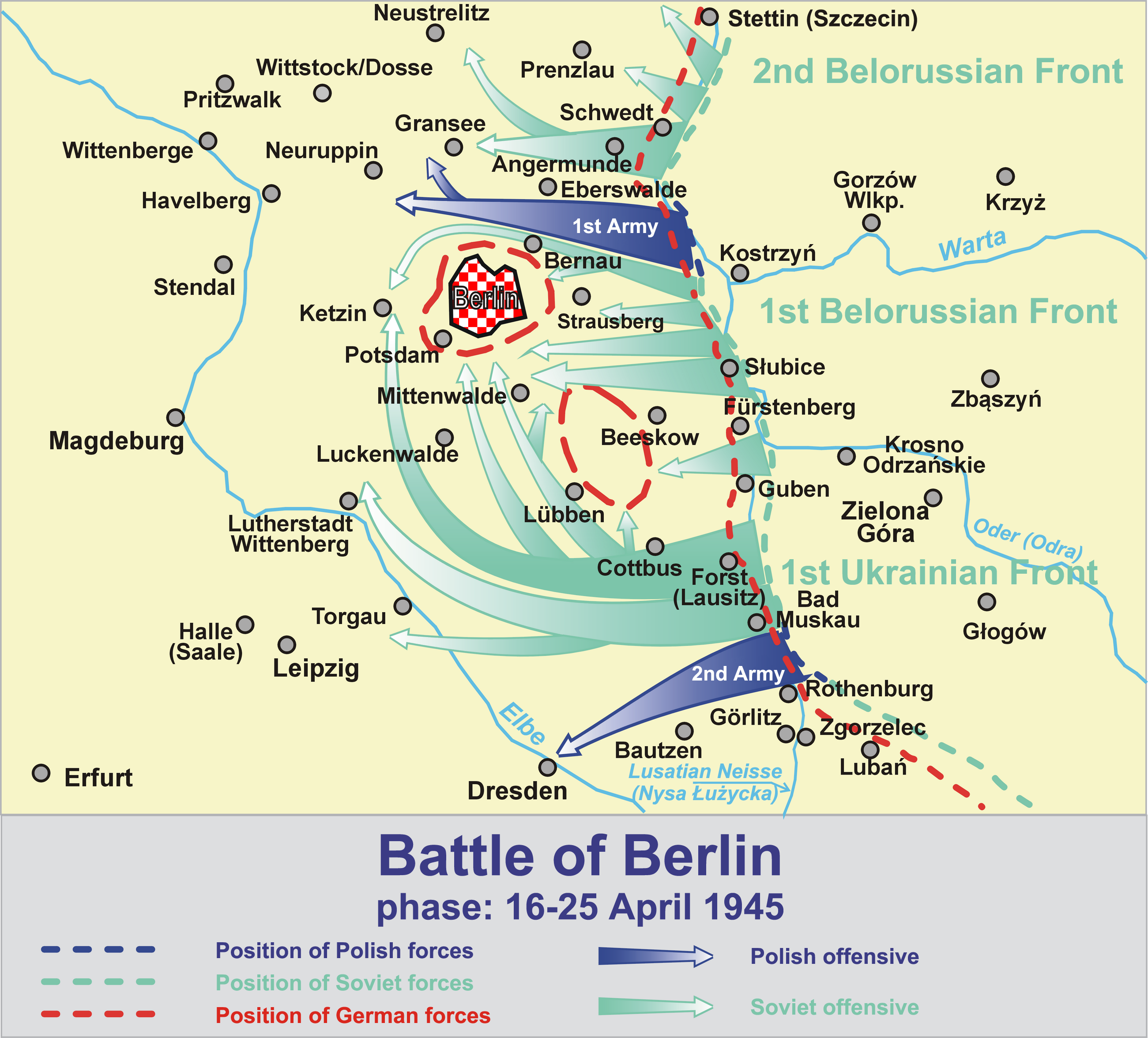
Battle of Berlin. Note locations of Forst and Cottbus and eventual encirclement of German 9th Army.

The offensive began on April 16. The 253rd and 329th Divisions were forced to attack through difficult wooded and swampy terrain in conditions of recently ignited forest fires. Having broken through the Germans' main defensive zone, by the end of the day the Corps had reached a line from outside Damsdorf to outside Simmersdorf, having advanced 9 km. In the course of this it had fought off several counterattacks by infantry and tanks of 21st Panzer Division, which had been transferred from the Cottbus area. The 6th Guards Tank Corps of 3rd Guards Tank Army began crossing the Neisse at 1400 hours, completing this by 1900, and by the end of the day its forward brigades were fighting alongside 21st Corps for Damsdorf.

The next day 3rd Guards Army, still with 6th Guards Tanks in support, resumed the attack at 0900 hours, encountering heavy resistance as it advanced on Cottbus. 21st Corps, still with the 253rd and 329th in the lead, reached with its left flank the second defensive zone in the Sergen area after taking this point. By the end of the day it was fighting in the woods along the line from outside Adlig-Dubrau–Sergen, having advanced 8 km. On April 18 the Corps, still in the same configuration, forced the Fliess Canal in heavy fighting, broke through the second defensive zone and, by day's end had gained a line from Hasow to the eastern outskirts of Karen to Frauendorf, having reached the Spree River in this area after another advance of 8 km. During this time it was being supported by the 22nd Guards Motorized Rifle Brigade and was being opposed by the newly arrived German 275th Infantry Division.

During April 19 the 3rd Guards Army encountered stubborn resistance from the Germans' Cottbus group of forces. The city was one of the most important resistance centers in the third defense zone. The 329th Division was moved to 120th Corps while the 58th Division entered the 21st Corps first echelon, along with the 389th Rifle Division from the Army reserve and the 106th Rifle Division from 76th Corps. By the end of the day the 21st Corps had reached the line from Frauendorf to Hallingen. Having turned its front to the north and forcing the Spree it began to attack toward Cottbus from the south along the western bank. The next day it continued enveloping the city from the south and west, advancing 9 km and by the end of the day was fighting along the line Hallingen–Hengen–Kolkwitz, with its front facing north and northeast. With the support of this advance the 3rd Guards Tank Army managed to cut the German grouping's retreat route to the west and pinned it to the Spree's swampy flood plain.

Over the next two days of stubborn fighting the 3rd Guards Army took Cottbus by storm and eliminated the Cottbus grouping, routing the 342nd, 214th and 275th Infantry Divisions plus a number of other elements and units. 1,500 prisoners were taken, plus 100 tanks, 2,000 motor vehicles, 60 guns, and several depots of military equipment. Following this the 21st Rifle and 25th Tank Corps concentrated in the bend of the Spree north of Cottbus. With the elimination of the Cottbus grouping the Army had enveloped the German Frankfurt–Guben grouping, which was based on the 9th Army, from the south and southwest.

==== Encirclement battle with 9th Army ====
During April 23 the 3rd Guards Army, in order to prevent a breakout by 9th Army, and to securely close the Lübbenau–Oderin sector, by the end of the day was moving its main forces to its left flank. The 253rd was fighting for Briesen while the remainder of the Corps was approaching the Lübben area. The encircled German grouping contained about 200,000 men, more than 2,000 guns and mortars, and more than 200 tanks and assault guns.

The commander of the encircled grouping, Gen. der Inf. T. Busse, received orders from Hitler on April 25 to break through the encirclement ring and attack in the direction of Halbe in an effort to link up with 12th Army, which was operating southwest of Berlin. On the morning of April 26 the 21st Corps was still fighting to reduce the pocket in an area from Teirow to Teupitz. Gordov was ordered to maintain one division in reserve in the Teupitz; to block all the forest roads running from east to west; to create strongpoints along the Cottbus–Berlin road; and take several other measures to prevent a breakout. After an overnight regrouping the German command had created a powerful breakthrough grouping led by 50 tanks to strike the boundary between 3rd Guards and 28th Armies. By 1000 hours it had created a gap between 329th and 58th Divisions in the Halbe area and had cut the Baruth–Zossen highway, which was the main communications artery for both Soviet armies. The just-arrived 389th Division, along with the 25th Tanks, counterattacked the breakthrough group from the Stackow area and isolated it from the remainder of the 9th Army. As a result of fighting during the remainder of the day and overnight a significant part of the breakthrough group was destroyed in the woods northeast of Baruth.

Following the elimination of the breakthrough group the front of the 21st and 120th Corps, as well as 28th Army's 130th and 152nd Rifle Divisions, remained along the line from Lübben to Krausnick to outside Teupitz to outside Mittenwalde. By this time the encircled German forces were occupying no more than 900 sq. km. On April 27 Gordov was ordered to preempt the formation of another breakthrough group by attacking with his first echelon divisions from the south and west in the general direction of Münchehofe. The 149th and 253rd Divisions were to take up defensive positions along the line Terpt and further north along the highway as far as Neuendorf. Despite these efforts the 9th Army made a further effort to break through the encirclement ring in the direction of Halbe. During the day numerous efforts were made by groups of up to 1,000 men, supported by armor, but none were successful. 1st Belorussian Front's 3rd Army linked up with units of 21st Corps in the Lopten–Halbe area.

As a result of the April 27 fighting the German group of forces in the woods north of Baruth was eliminated, as were all their attempts to again organize a breakthrough to the west. By now the pocket had shrunk to about 400 sq. km. During the next day forces of both Fronts continued squeezing the ring. In the morning the 9th Army made another effort to escape through the Halbe area with a group up to an infantry division in strength, supported by up to 18-20 tanks. This struck the sector Teirow–Lopten occupied by 21st Corps and 40th Rifle Corps of 3rd Army. By the end of the day, having beaten off 12 German attacks, the units of both Corps continued to hold their previous positions. In the process they took 3,000 prisoners and seized 15 tanks and 68 guns. By the end of the day the pocket was about 10 km north-to-south and up to 14 km east-to-west.

The German command faced the prospect of complete defeat of 9th Army and so overnight undertook a new and decisive attempt to break out with the bulk of its remaining forces in an effort to link up with another break-in attempt by 12th Army. The attack began at 0100 hours on April 29, led by up to 10,000 infantry, supported by 35-40 tanks, at the Teirow–Halbe boundary. At dawn, following heavy fighting, the German grouping managed to break through the 21st and 40th Corps, reach the Staatsforst Stachow woods and cut the highway 3 km southeast of Tornow. The breakout was temporarily halted by units of 28th Army's 3rd Guards Rifle Corps but the German grouping was now reinforced to a strength of up to 45,000 troops and created a 2 km-wide breach between 50th Guards and 54th Guards Rifle Divisions in the Münchendorf area. Taking advantage of this breach, despite powerful artillery and mortar fire from north and south, German forces began to break out, first in small groups and then in entire columns, to the Staatsforst Kummersdorf woods. By the end of the day the breakout had again been halted by reinforcements from 3rd Guards and 4th Guards Tank Armies and the 117th Guards Rifle Division. At the same time the 120th and 76th Corps were attacking toward 21st Corps in an effort to re-close the gap in the Teirow sector; 21st Corps, with part of the 25th Tanks, was fighting along the line Tornow–Halbe, with its front facing south. As a result of these and other counterattacks the greater part of 9th Army was again encircled. It was still 30 km from 12th Army.

Overnight, the Army commanders of 1st Ukrainian Front undertook a number of measures directed at preventing any further German advance to the west and finally eliminating the pocketed forces. Gordov directed his Corps operating in the Tornow–Freidorf area, to destroy the German units by attacks from the east. Meanwhile, the German grouping continued to make desperate efforts to escape, gaining another 10 km to the west. By the end of the day 3rd Guards Army, fighting through the Staatsforst Stachow woods, destroyed the tail end of the grouping. At this point its remnants had been split into separate groups which were out of contact with each other, and mass surrenders began; 1st Ukrainian Front alone took 24,000 prisoners. The last resistance ended on May 1.

== Postwar ==
When the shooting stopped the division was advancing on Prague with most of its Front's forces. In a final honor on June 4 it was awarded the Order of Suvorov, 2nd Degree, for its part in the liquidation of German 9th Army. On June 27, Epin was promoted to the rank of major general and almost immediately took command of the 103rd Guards Rifle Division. He spent most of the rest of his career in the training establishment and retired in October 1953.

According to STAVKA Order No. 11096 of May 29, 1945, part 8, the 253rd is listed as one of the rifle divisions to be "disbanded in place". It was disbanded in accordance with the directive between July 10–15.
