= Groß Köris =

- Municipality
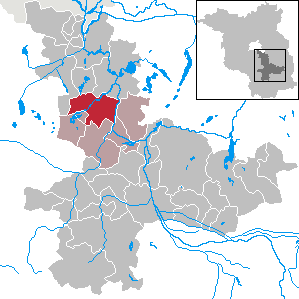
- Location of Groß Köris within Dahme-Spreewald district
- Interactive map of Groß Köris
- Location within Germany Location within Brandenburg
- Coordinates: 52°10′00″N 13°40′00″E
- Country: Germany
- State: Brandenburg
- District: Dahme-Spreewald
- Municipal assoc.: Schenkenländchen
- Subdivisions: 2 Ortsteile

Government
  - Mayor (2024–29): Marco Kehling

Area
  - Total: 68.09 km^{2} (26.29 sq mi)
- Elevation: 35 m (115 ft)

Population (2025-12-31)
  - Total: 2,619
  - Density: 38.46/km^{2} (99.62/sq mi)
- Time zone: UTC+01:00 (CET)
  - Summer (DST): UTC+02:00 (CEST)
- Postal codes: 15746
- Dialling codes: 033766
- Vehicle registration: LDS

Groß Köris (German: [ɡʁoːs ˈkøːʁɪs]) is a municipality in the district of Dahme-Spreewald in Brandenburg in Germany.

== Demography ==
Development of population since 1875 within the current boundaries (Blue line: Population; Dotted line: Comparison to population development of Brandenburg state; Grey background: Time of Nazi rule; Red background: Time of communist rule)

Groß Köris: Population development
within the current boundaries (2020)

Year	Pop.	±% p.a.
1875	783	—
1890	1,017	+1.76%
1910	1,433	+1.73%
1925	1,667	+1.01%
1933	1,781	+0.83%
1939	2,045	+2.33%
1946	2,610	+3.55%
1950	2,689	+0.75%
1964	2,434	−0.71%
1971	2,424	−0.06%
1981	2,160	−1.15%
1985	2,148	−0.14%
1989	2,027	−1.44%
1990	2,000	−1.33%
1991	1,935	−3.25%

Year	Pop.	±% p.a.
1992	1,940	+0.26%
1993	1,976	+1.86%
1994	1,992	+0.81%
1995	2,000	+0.40%
1996	2,071	+3.55%
1997	2,085	+0.68%
1998	2,129	+2.11%
1999	2,150	+0.99%
2000	2,210	+2.79%
2001	2,215	+0.23%
2002	2,188	−1.22%
2003	2,197	+0.41%
2004	2,120	−3.50%
2005	2,248	+6.04%
2006	2,247	−0.04%

Year	Pop.	±% p.a.
2007	2,271	+1.07%
2008	2,334	+2.77%
2009	2,340	+0.26%
2010	2,326	−0.60%
2011	2,224	−4.39%
2012	2,209	−0.67%
2013	2,209	+0.00%
2014	2,243	+1.54%
2015	2,253	+0.45%
2016	2,265	+0.53%
2017	2,294	+1.28%
2018	2,338	+1.92%
2019	2,353	+0.64%
2020	2,371	+0.76%
