= Schwerin, Brandenburg =

Schwerin
- Municipality
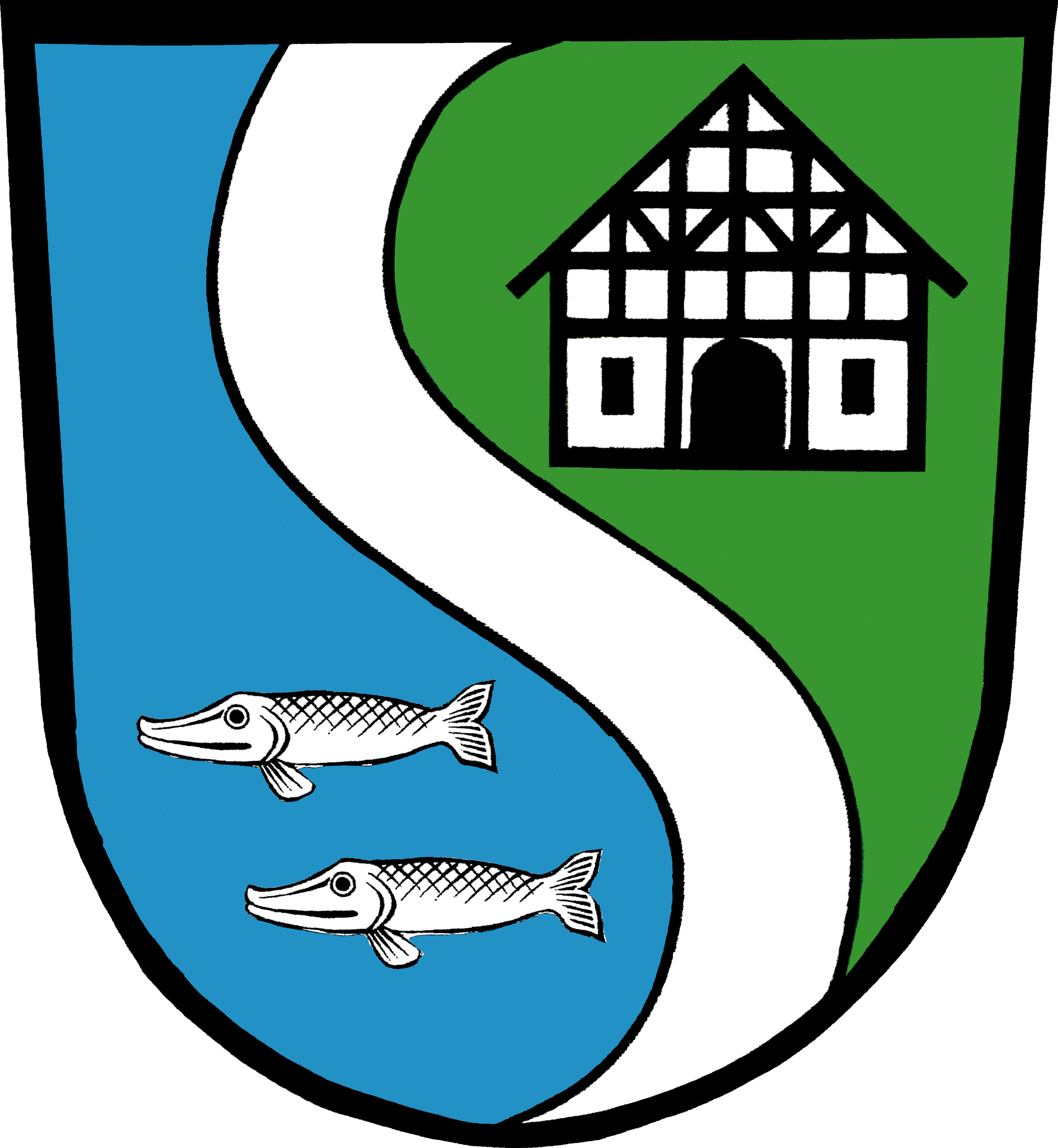
- Coat of arms

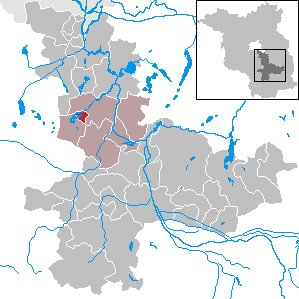
- Location of Schwerin within Dahme-Spreewald district
- Interactive map of Schwerin
- Location within Germany Location within Brandenburg
- Coordinates: 52°09′N 13°38′E
- Country: Germany
- State: Brandenburg
- District: Dahme-Spreewald
- Municipal assoc.: Schenkenländchen

Government
  - Mayor (2024–29): Michael Manthey

Area
  - Total: 6.72 km^{2} (2.59 sq mi)
- Elevation: 38 m (125 ft)

Population (2025-12-31)
  - Total: 963
  - Density: 143/km^{2} (371/sq mi)
- Time zone: UTC+01:00 (CET)
  - Summer (DST): UTC+02:00 (CEST)
- Postal codes: 15755
- Dialling codes: 033766
- Vehicle registration: LDS
- Website: www.amt-schenkenlaendchen.de

Schwerin (German pronunciation: [ʃveˈʁiːn]; Lower Sorbian: Zwěrin) is a municipality in the district of Dahme-Spreewald in Brandenburg in Germany.

== Demography ==
Development of population since 1875 within the current boundaries (Blue line: Population; Dotted line: Comparison to population development of Brandenburg state; Grey background: Time of Nazi rule; Red background: Time of communist rule)

Schwerin [Dahme-Spreewald]: Population development
within the current boundaries (2017)

Year	Pop.	±% p.a.
1875	136	—
1890	155	+0.88%
1910	316	+3.63%
1925	378	+1.20%
1933	420	+1.33%
1939	521	+3.66%
1946	966	+9.22%
1950	885	−2.17%
1964	871	−0.11%
1971	892	+0.34%
1981	815	−0.90%
1985	766	−1.54%
1989	762	−0.13%
1990	749	−1.71%

Year	Pop.	±% p.a.
1991	727	−2.94%
1992	728	+0.14%
1993	725	−0.41%
1994	712	−1.79%
1995	709	−0.42%
1996	702	−0.99%
1997	706	+0.57%
1998	683	−3.26%
1999	677	−0.88%
2000	665	−1.77%
2001	659	−0.90%
2002	651	−1.21%
2003	652	+0.15%
2004	629	−3.53%

Year	Pop.	±% p.a.
2005	643	+2.23%
2006	629	−2.18%
2007	602	−4.29%
2008	613	+1.83%
2009	637	+3.92%
2010	630	−1.10%
2011	780	+23.81%
2012	794	+1.79%
2013	792	−0.25%
2014	815	+2.90%
2015	814	−0.12%
2016	815	+0.12%
2017	820	+0.61%
