= Teupitzer See =

Lake in Germany

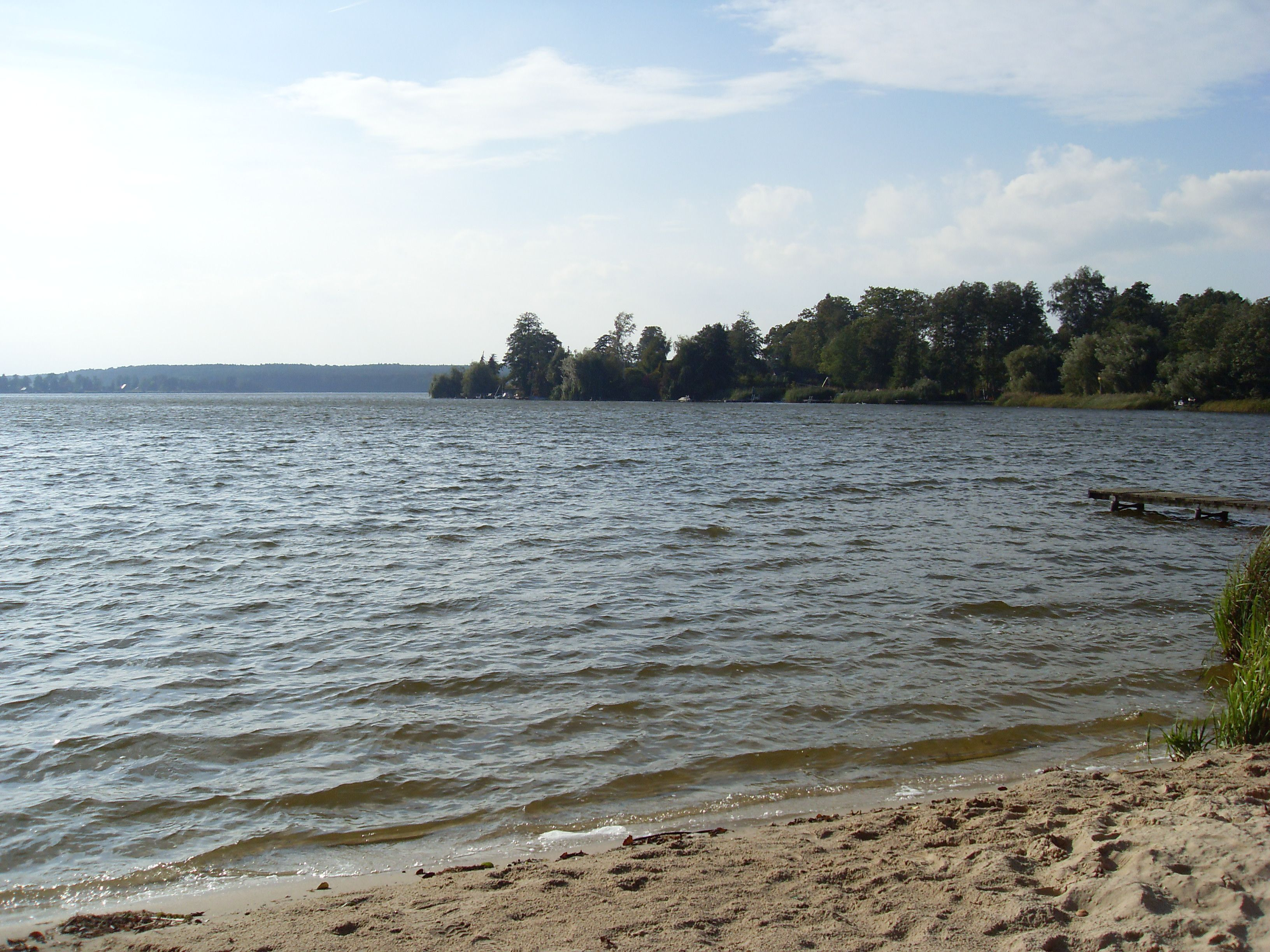

- Location within Brandenburg
- Location: Teupitzer Gewässer, Brandenburg
- Coordinates: 52°8′44″N 13°36′43″E
- Primary outflows: Mochgraben
- Basin countries: Germany

Teupitzer See is a lake in Teupitzer Gewässer, Brandenburg, Germany. It is located in the town of Teupitz.
