= Sivkovo, Vladimir Oblast =

Sivkovo Сивково
- Village
- Location within Vladimir Oblast Location within Russia
- Coordinates: 56°27′N 38°51′E
- Country: Russia
- Region: Vladimir Oblast
- District: Alexandrovsky District
- Time zone: UTC+3:00

Sivkovo (Russian: Сивково) is a rural locality (a village) in Andreyevskoye Rural Settlement, Alexandrovsky District, Vladimir Oblast, Russia. The population was 6 as of 2010.

== Geography ==
Sivkovo is located 13 km northeast of Alexandrov (the district's administrative centre) by road. Moshnino is the nearest rural locality.
