= Münchehofe =

- Municipality
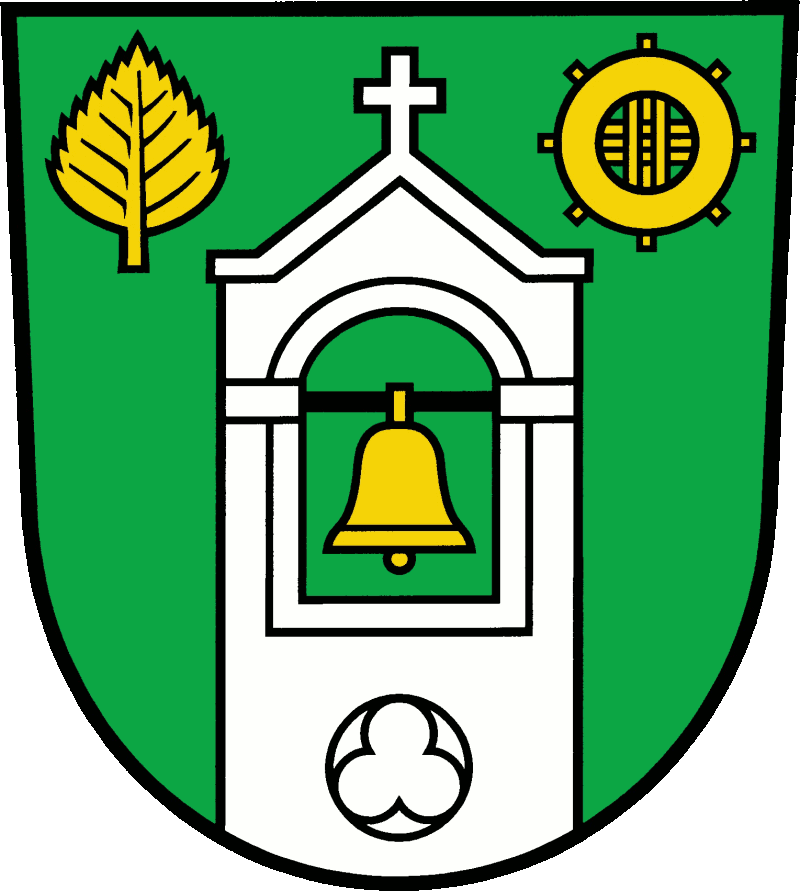
- Coat of arms

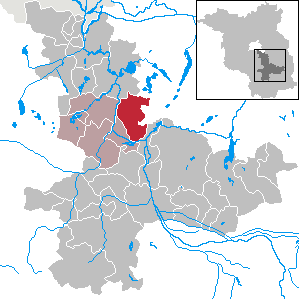
- Location of Münchehofe within Dahme-Spreewald district
- Interactive map of Münchehofe
- Location within Germany Location within Brandenburg
- Coordinates: 52°08′49″N 13°50′10″E
- Country: Germany
- State: Brandenburg
- District: Dahme-Spreewald
- Municipal assoc.: Schenkenländchen
- Subdivisions: 3 Ortsteile

Government
  - Mayor (2024–29): Ralf Irmscher

Area
  - Total: 62.32 km^{2} (24.06 sq mi)
- Elevation: 45 m (148 ft)

Population (2025-12-31)
  - Total: 418
  - Density: 6.71/km^{2} (17.4/sq mi)
- Time zone: UTC+01:00 (CET)
  - Summer (DST): UTC+02:00 (CEST)
- Postal codes: 15748
- Dialling codes: 033760
- Vehicle registration: LDS
- Website: www.amt-schenkenlaendchen.de

Münchehofe (German pronunciation: [mʏnçəˈhoːfə]) is a municipality in the district of Dahme-Spreewald in Brandenburg in Germany.

== Demography ==
Development of population since 1875 within the current boundaries (Blue line: Population; Dotted line: Comparison to population development of Brandenburg state; Grey background: Time of Nazi rule; Red background: Time of communist rule)

Münchehofe: Population development
within the current boundaries (2017)

Year	Pop.	±% p.a.
1875	1,090	—
1890	1,004	−0.55%
1910	891	−0.60%
1925	878	−0.10%
1933	838	−0.58%
1939	772	−1.36%
1946	1,224	+6.81%
1950	1,164	−1.25%
1964	790	−2.73%
1971	746	−0.82%
1981	655	−1.29%
1985	622	−1.28%
1989	592	−1.23%
1990	582	−1.69%

Year	Pop.	±% p.a.
1991	573	−1.55%
1992	571	−0.35%
1993	579	+1.40%
1994	589	+1.73%
1995	569	−3.40%
1996	568	−0.18%
1997	585	+2.99%
1998	598	+2.22%
1999	587	−1.84%
2000	576	−1.87%
2001	560	−2.78%
2002	570	+1.79%
2003	563	−1.23%
2004	557	−1.07%

Year	Pop.	±% p.a.
2005	535	−3.95%
2006	528	−1.31%
2007	528	+0.00%
2008	514	−2.65%
2009	498	−3.11%
2010	492	−1.20%
2011	482	−2.03%
2012	486	+0.83%
2013	477	−1.85%
2014	481	+0.84%
2015	469	−2.49%
2016	470	+0.21%
2017	472	+0.43%
