= Durovo, Kochyovsky District, Perm Krai =

Durovo Дурово
- Village
- Location within Perm Krai Location within Russia
- Coordinates: 59°32′N 54°15′E
- Country: Russia
- Region: Perm Krai
- District: Kochyovsky District
- Time zone: UTC+5:00

Durovo (Russian: Дурово) is a rural locality (a village) in Kochyovskoye Rural Settlement, Kochyovsky District, Perm Krai, Russia. The population was 7 as of 2010. There are 3 streets.

== Geography ==
Durovo is located 11 km southwest of Kochyovo (the district's administrative centre) by road. Shorsha is the nearest rural locality.
