= Moskvyata, Permsky District, Perm Krai =

Moskvyata Москвята
- Village
- Location within Perm Krai Location within Russia
- Coordinates: 57°55′N 55°51′E
- Country: Russia
- Region: Perm Krai
- District: Permsky District
- Time zone: UTC+5:00

Moskvyata (Russian: Москвята) is a rural locality (a village) in Kultayevskoye Rural Settlement, Permsky District, Perm Krai, Russia. The population was 3 as of 2010. There are 2 streets.

== Geography ==
Moskvyata is located 28 km southwest of Perm (the district's administrative centre) by road. Murashi is the nearest rural locality.
