= Teupitz =

- Town
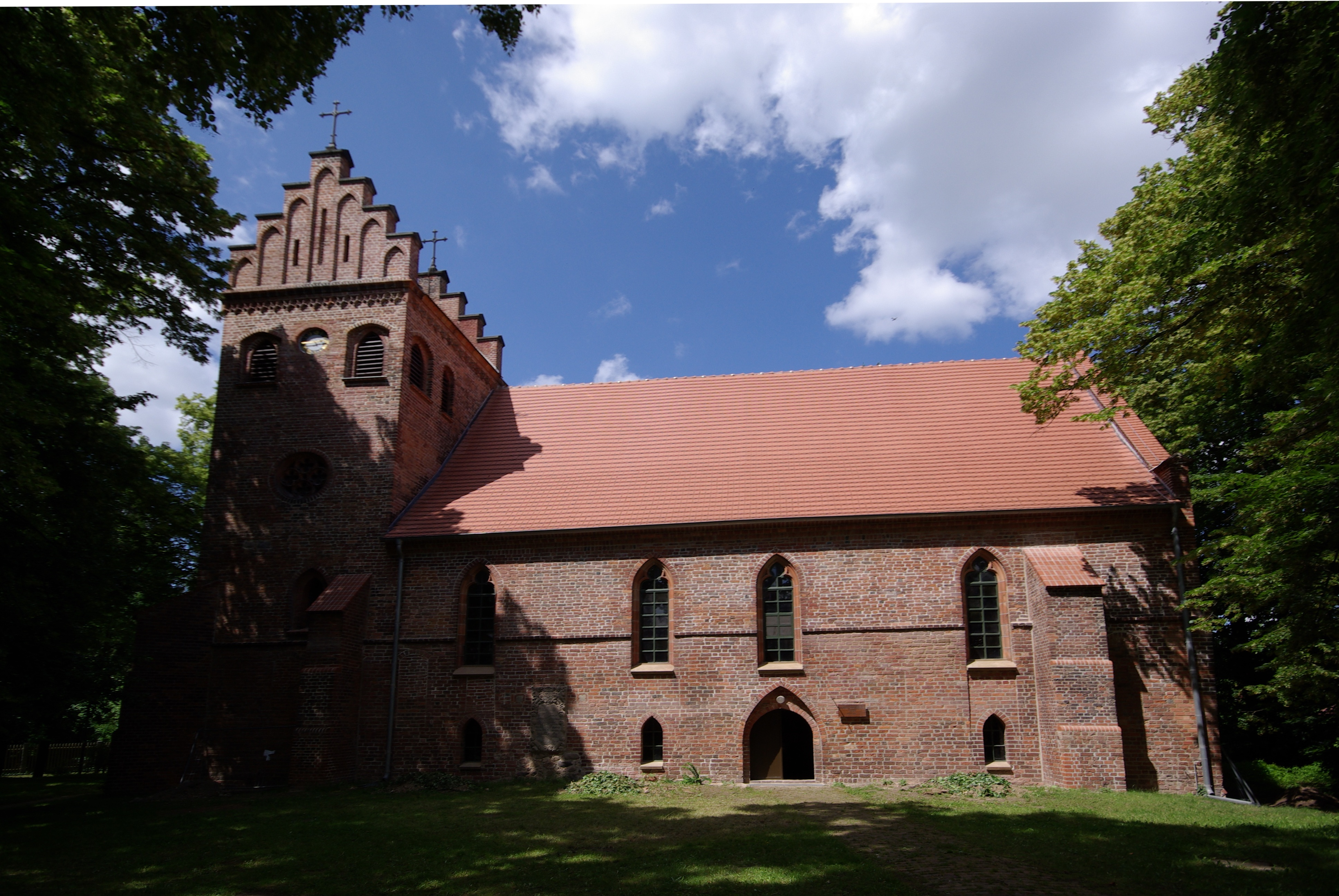
- Church of the Holy Spirit

- Coat of arms

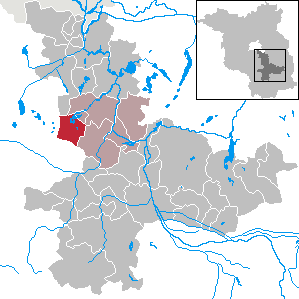
- Location of Teupitz within Dahme-Spreewald district
- Interactive map of Teupitz
- Location within Germany Location within Brandenburg
- Coordinates: 52°08′10″N 13°36′38″E
- Country: Germany
- State: Brandenburg
- District: Dahme-Spreewald
- Municipal assoc.: Schenkenländchen
- Subdivisions: 3 Ortsteile

Government
  - Mayor (2024–29): Manuela Steyer

Area
  - Total: 48.15 km^{2} (18.59 sq mi)
- Elevation: 36 m (118 ft)

Population (2025-12-31)
  - Total: 1,907
  - Density: 39.61/km^{2} (102.6/sq mi)
- Time zone: UTC+01:00 (CET)
  - Summer (DST): UTC+02:00 (CEST)
- Postal codes: 15755
- Dialling codes: 033766
- Vehicle registration: LDS
- Website: www.teupitz.de

Teupitz (German: [ˈtɔʏpɪts]; Lower Sorbian: Tupc, pronounced [ˈtupts]) is a small town in the Dahme-Spreewald district, in Brandenburg, Germany. It is the administrative seat of the Schenkenländchen municipal association (Amt).

== Geography ==
The town is situated on the southern shore of Teupitzer See lake, 29 km (18 mi) northwest of the district capital Lübben, and about 45 km (28 mi) south of Berlin centre. The municipal area comprises the subdivisions of Egsdorf, Neuendorf and Tornow.

It has access to the Bundesautobahn 13, part of the European route E55, at the nearby Teupitz junction.

== Demography ==
Development of population since 1875 within the current boundaries (Blue line: Population; Dotted line: Comparison to population development of Brandenburg state; Grey background: Time of Nazi rule; Red background: Time of communist rule)

Teupitz: Population development
within the current boundaries (2017)

Year	Pop.	±% p.a.
1875	1,400	—
1890	1,470	+0.33%
1910	3,199	+3.96%
1925	3,019	−0.39%
1933	3,614	+2.27%
1939	3,988	+1.65%
1946	2,622	−5.81%
1950	2,695	+0.69%
1964	2,286	−1.17%
1971	2,126	−1.03%
1981	1,819	−1.55%
1985	1,725	−1.32%
1989	1,649	−1.12%
1990	1,652	+0.18%

Year	Pop.	±% p.a.
1991	1,629	−1.39%
1992	1,658	+1.78%
1993	1,689	+1.87%
1994	1,744	+3.26%
1995	1,733	−0.63%
1996	1,711	−1.27%
1997	1,672	−2.28%
1998	1,794	+7.30%
1999	1,826	+1.78%
2000	1,843	+0.93%
2001	1,891	+2.60%
2002	1,888	−0.16%
2003	1,885	−0.16%
2004	1,887	+0.11%

Year	Pop.	±% p.a.
2005	1,926	+2.07%
2006	1,920	−0.31%
2007	1,890	−1.56%
2008	1,870	−1.06%
2009	1,844	−1.39%
2010	1,831	−0.70%
2011	1,802	−1.58%
2012	1,786	−0.89%
2013	1,785	−0.06%
2014	1,812	+1.51%
2015	1,813	+0.06%
2016	1,868	+3.03%
2017	1,880	+0.64%

== History ==
Teupitz probably arose from a medieval Slavic settlement during the Ostsiedlung of German peasants and craftsmen. A Tupcz fortification was first mentioned in a 1307 deed, issued by Margrave Herman of Brandenburg at Spandau. The Ascanian rulers of Margraviate of Brandenburg had just acquired the estates in the former March of Lusatia from Margrave Dietrich IV of Wettin.

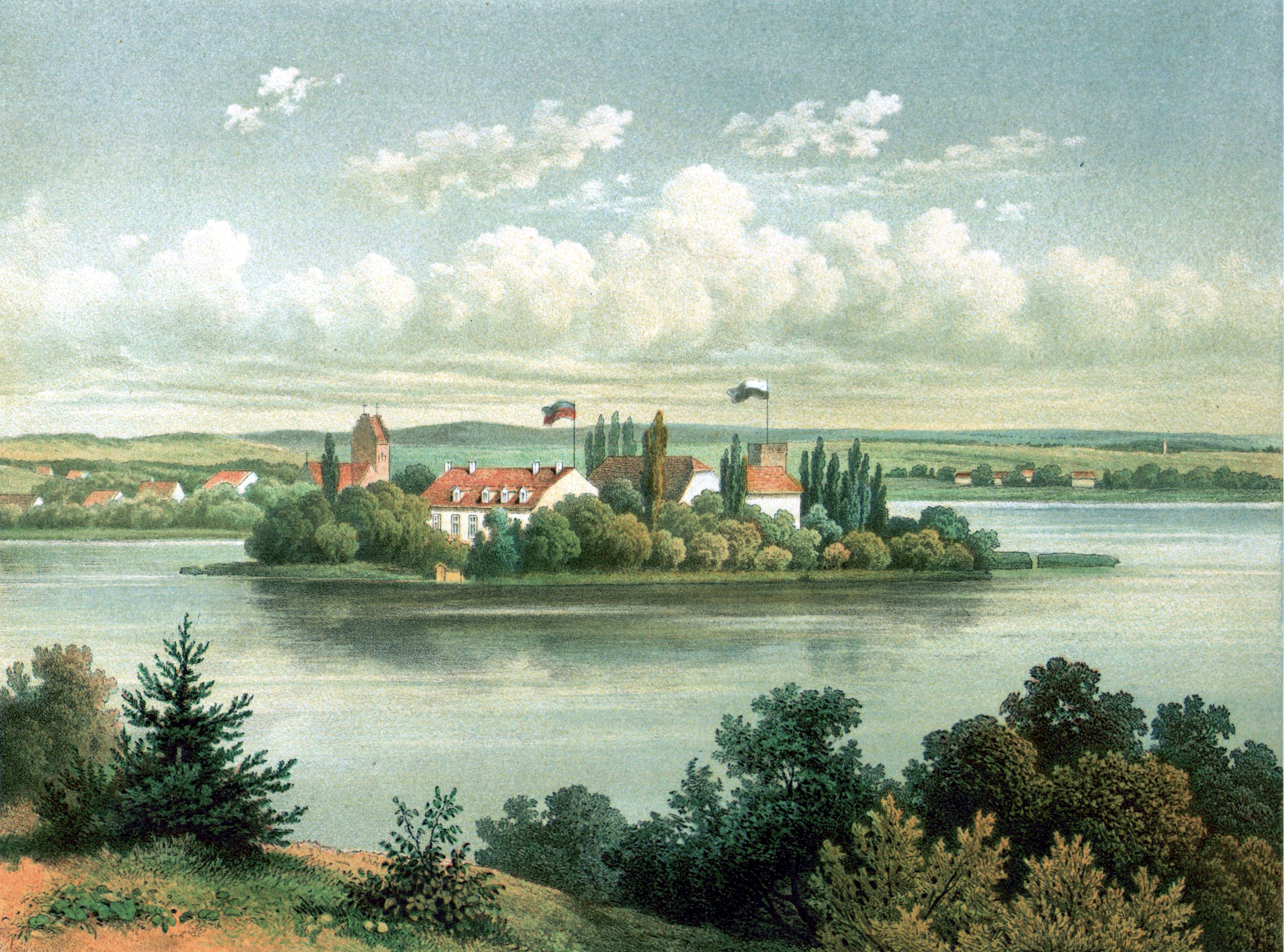
Teupitz Castle, lithograph, coll. Alexander Duncker (1813-1897)

The castle, located on a peninsula, from about 1330 served as a seat of the Schenk von Landsberg noble family. In 1411 one Albert Schenk von Landsberg, Lord of Teupitz and of Seyda in Saxe-Wittenberg, served as the Saxon representative at the (second) election of King Sigismund. The dynasty flourished for about four centuries until its extinction in 1721, leaving the local water castle as well as further residences in Königs Wusterhausen and Groß Leuthen. They also had the Brick Gothic Holy Ghost parish church erected and in 1437 on their own authority elevated Teupitz to the status of a town.

From 1717 the remnants of the castle were acquired by the Prussian state and served as the seat of the local Prussian Amt administration until 1812, when it was purchased as a private Rittergut manor. The town privileges were acknowledged in the 1808 Prussian reforms and a town hall was erected in 1830. After Theodor Fontane had published his Wanderungen durch die Mark Brandenburg travelogue in 1880, Teupitz due to its picturesque setting became a popular destination for daytrippers from the Berlin agglomeration. In 1910 the Prussian Province of Brandenburg opened a sanatorium and in 1930 the former castle was again rebuilt as a hotel, which after World War II was used as a recreation centre by the East German Communist Party (SED).

== Politics ==
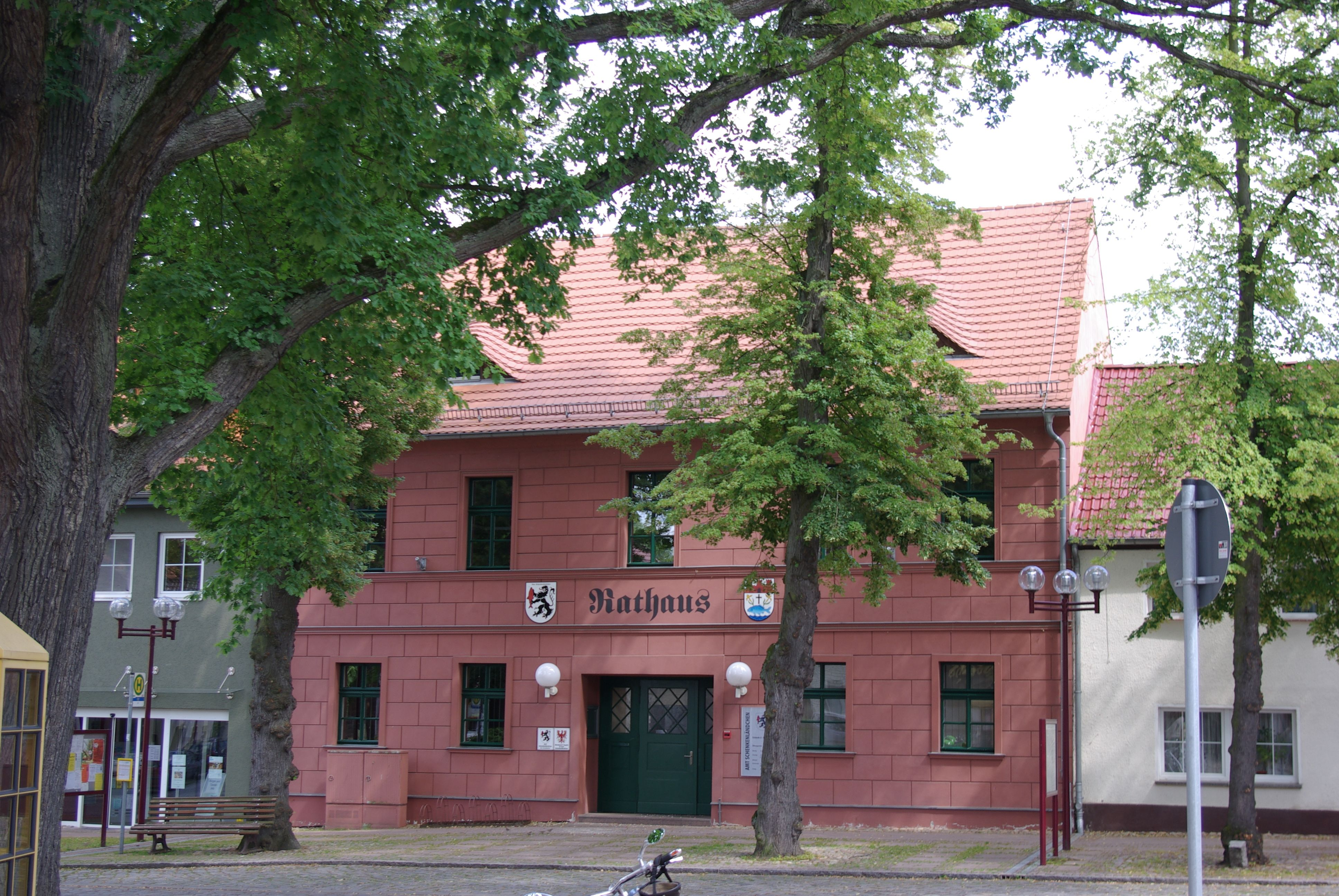
Town hall

Seats in the town's assembly (Stadtverordnetenversammlung) as of 2008 elections:

- Free Voters: 7
- Christian Democratic Union (CDU): 5
