= Vereshchaginsky District =

Vereshchaginsky District Верещагинский район
- District
- Flag Coat of arms
- Location of Vereshchaginsky District in Perm Krai
- Coordinates: 58.1°N 54.441°E
- Country: Russia
- Federal subject: Perm Krai
- Established: January 1, 1924
- Administrative center: Vereshchagino

Area
  - Total: 1,621 km^{2} (626 sq mi)

Population (2010 Census)
  - Total: 41,379
  - Density: 25.53/km^{2} (66.11/sq mi)
  - Urban: 53.5%
  - Rural: 46.5%

Administrative structure
  - Inhabited localities: 1 cities/towns, 1 urban-type settlements, 159 rural localities

Municipal structure
  - Municipally incorporated as: Vereshchaginsky Municipal District
  - Municipal divisions: 1 urban settlements, 6 rural settlements
- Time zone: UTC+5 (MSK+2)
- OKTMO ID: 57612000
- Website: http://veradm.ru/

Vereshchaginsky District (Russian: Вереща́гинский райо́н) is an administrative district (raion) of Perm Krai, Russia; one of the thirty-three districts in the krai. Municipally, it is incorporated as Vereshchaginsky Municipal District. It is located in the west of the krai,with an area of 1,621 square kilometers (626 sq mi). Its administrative center is the town of Vereshchagino. Population: 41,379 (2010 Census); 43,958 (2002 Census); 46,714 (1989 Soviet census). The population of Vereshchagino accounts for 53.5% of the district's total population.

== Geography ==
The Lysva River, a tributary of the Obva, flows through the district, dividing it into two nearly equal parts. The district's average elevation above sea level varies between 200 and 250 meters (660 and 820 ft), increasing to 300–310 meters (980–1,020 ft) in the northwest.

== History ==
The district was established on January 1, 1924.

== Demographics ==
The most numerous ethnic groups, according to the 2002 Census, include Russians at 94.9%, Udmurts at 2%, and Komi-Permyak people at 1.1%.

== Economy ==
Manufacture of plastics and knitwear, as well as food and timber industry and agriculture, are developed in the district.

== See also ==
- Zakharyata

== Notable residents ==
- Yevgeny Obukhov (1921–1944), Red Army sergeant, Hero of the Soviet Union, born in the village of Malga
