= Vereshchagino, Vereshchaginsky District, Perm Krai =

Town in Perm Krai, Russia

Vereshchagino Верещагино
- Town
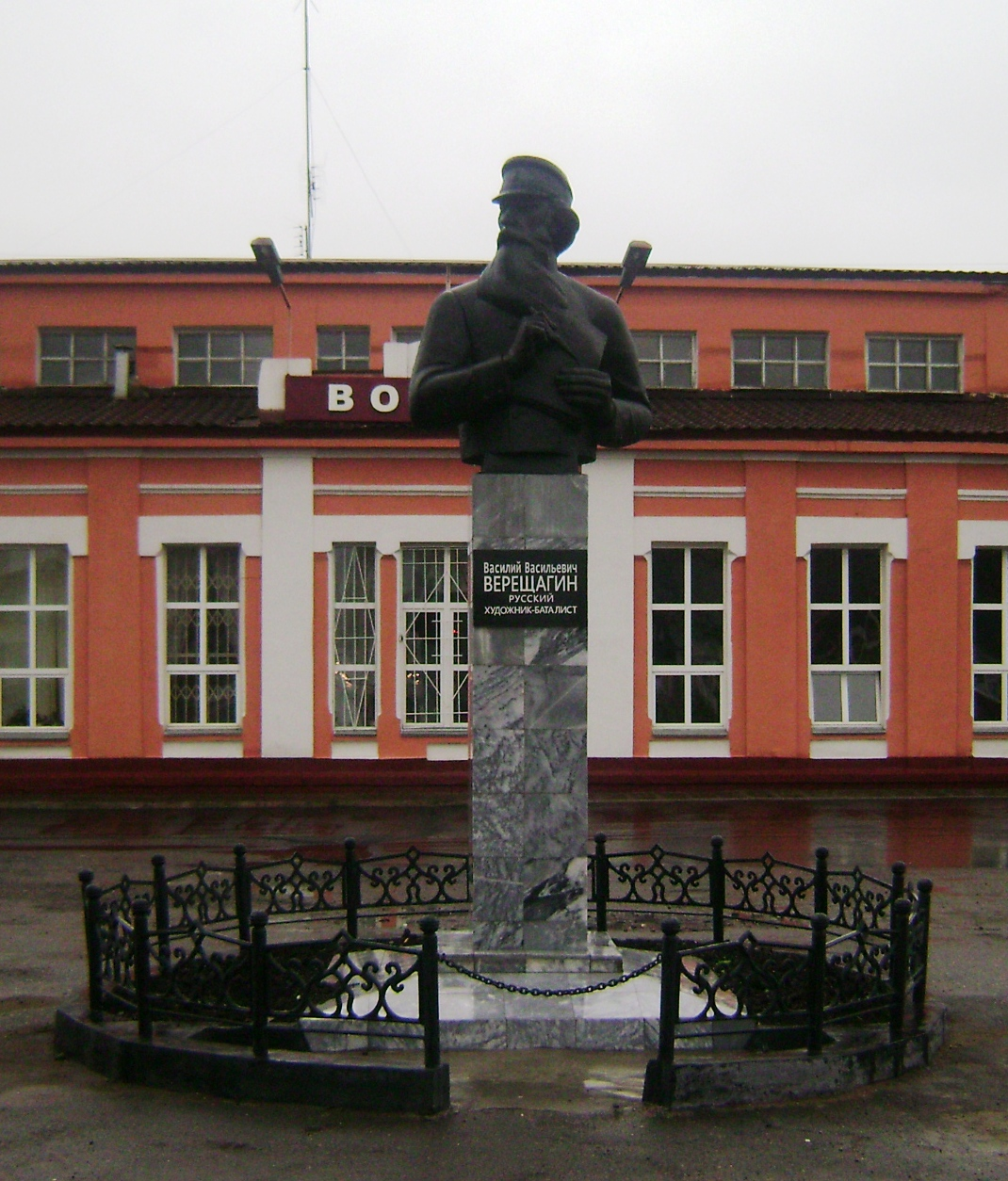
- Monument to war artist Vasily Vereshchagin, for whom the town was named, on the station square

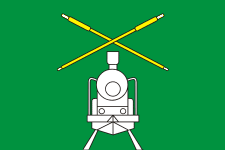
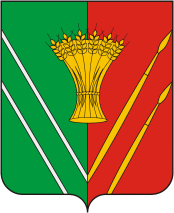
- Flag Coat of arms
- Interactive map of Vereshchagino
- Location of Vereshchagino Vereshchagino (Perm Krai)
- Coordinates: 58°06′N 54°40′E
- Country: Russia
- Federal subject: Perm Krai
- Administrative district: Vereshchaginsky District
- Founded: 1898
- Town status since: 1942
- Elevation: 220 m (720 ft)

Population (2010 Census)
  - Total: 22,156
  - Estimate (2023): 22,077 (−0.4%)

Administrative status
  - Capital of: Vereshchaginsky District

Municipal status
  - Municipal district: Vereshchaginsky Municipal District
  - Urban settlement: Vereshchaginskoye Urban Settlement
  - Capital of: Vereshchaginsky Municipal District, Vereshchaginskoye Urban Settlement
- Time zone: UTC+5 (MSK+2)
- Postal codes: 617119, 617120, 617123, 617126, 617129
- OKTMO ID: 57612101001
- Website: portal-vereschagino.ru

Vereshchagino (Russian: Вереща́гино) is a town and the administrative center of Vereshchaginsky District in Perm Krai, Russia, located 124 kilometers (77 mi) west of Perm, the administrative center of the krai. As of the 2010 Census, its population was 22,156.

== History ==
The town was founded as a settlement near the station in 1898. In 1899, the station was given the name of Ocherskaya. In 1904, it was renamed Voznesenskaya, after the name of a nearby volost center.

The modern name is associated with the fact that in 1904 the war artist Vasily Vereshchagin allegedly stopped on his way to the Far East, where he died in April 1904, when the battleship Petropavlovsk was sunk by a mine. Twelve years later, at the request of the inhabitants, the Voznesenskaya station was renamed in honour of the painter.

In the city there is a monument to V.V. Vereshchagin (pictured).

On January 1, 1924, the Vereshchagino settlement became a village and district centre of the same name. It was given city status on June 19, 1942.

== Administrative and municipal status ==
Within the framework of administrative divisions, Vereshchagino serves as the administrative center of Vereshchaginsky District, to which it is directly subordinated. As a municipal division, the town of Vereshchagino, together with ten rural localities, is incorporated within Vereshchaginsky Municipal District as Vereshchaginskoye Urban Settlement.

== Economy ==
Food industry, production of knitwear, manufacture of spare parts and reinforced concrete structures form the basis of the town's economy. The town is also a large railway traffic center.

== Demographics ==
Historical population of Vereshchagino

Year	Pop.	±%
1959	22,900	—
1970	23,600	+3.1%
1979	22,349	−5.3%

Year	Pop.	±%
1989	24,129	+8.0%
2002	22,832	−5.4%
2010	22,156	−3.0%
