= 162nd Rifle Division =

162nd Rifle Division (July 16, 1940 – December 27, 1941) 162nd Rifle Division (December 1941 – July 24, 1942) 162nd Rifle Division (November 1942 - July 1945)
- Active: 1940–1945
- Country: Soviet Union
- Branch: Red Army
- Type: Infantry
- Size: Division
- Engagements: Operation Barbarossa; Battle of Smolensk (1941); Battle of Moscow; Second Battle of Kharkov; Operation Fridericus II; Case Blue; Sevsk-Trubchevsk offensive Oryol offensive Battle of Kursk; Operation Kutuzov; Gomel-Rechytsa offensive Kalinkavichy offensive Ozarichi-Ptsich offensive Kamenets–Podolsky pocket Lvov-Sandomierz Offensive; Vistula–Oder offensive East Pomeranian offensive Battle of Berlin
- Decorations: Order of the Red Banner; Order of Suvorov (both 3rd Formation)
- Battle honours: Central Asian; Novgorod-Severskii (both 3rd Formation)

Commanders
- Notable commanders: Col. Nikolai Fyodorovich Kolkunov; Col. Mitrofan Ilich Matveev; Maj. Gen. Sergei Yakovlevich Senchillo; Col. Stepan Ivanovich Chernyak; Col. Lazar Vasilevich Grinvald-Mukho; Col. Anatolii Olegovich Muratov

The 162nd Rifle Division was originally formed as an infantry division of the Red Army in August 1940 in the Kharkov Military District, based on the shtat (table of organization and equipment) of the previous September. At the start of the German invasion in June 1941 it was in Lubny, Poltava Oblast, and was quickly sent to the front as part of Western Front's 19th Army. After first counterattacking in an effort to retake Vitebsk it was forced to fall back toward Smolensk. During August and into September, now as part of 30th Army, it took part in several counteroffensives against German 9th Army in the Dukhovshchina area in an effort to retake Smolensk, but these were ultimately unsuccessful while costing the division considerable strength. At the start of Operation Typhoon in October the 162nd was located at the boundary of the two Soviet armies in well-prepared positions, but was struck with overwhelming numbers of infantry, tanks, and aircraft. With one regiment quickly encircled the remainder were shouldered away to the north and east. Soon pocketed with the remains of two other divisions the 162nd managed to reach Soviet-held territory in the Kalinin region late in the month, but in November was disbanded to supply replacements for other units.

A new 162nd was designated in January 1942 in the Ural Military District based on a 400-series division that had begun forming the previous month. In March it moved to the Reserve of the Supreme High Command where it was assigned to the reformed 28th Army, soon part of Southwestern Front. In mid-May the Army formed part of the Front's northern shock group in the offensive to retake Kharkiv; while the 162nd was initially in second echelon it was soon brought up to the front line and attacked near Vesele on May 18 without any lasting success. Following this offensive the division was transferred to 38th Army and was under this command in late June when the German summer offensive began. Twice encircled over the following weeks it failed to escape across the Don River in any numbers and was disbanded in late July.

The final 162nd began as the Central Asian Rifle Division of the NKVD in November in the Central Asian Military District. It retained the name "Central Asian" as an honorific. Early in the new year it, and five similar divisions, were transferred to the Red Army and formed as the new 70th Army. The Army was soon assigned to Central Front, where it joined the advance toward Oryol in late February and March 1943, but proved ineffective due to low standards of training and leadership. It did not see much combat in the Battle of Kursk, being largely confined to second echelon, but advanced into eastern Ukraine in September as part of 65th Army, where it won a battle honor. In October it entered eastern Belarus and in the November fighting for Rechytsa it was awarded the Order of the Red Banner. It battled through the winter in this general area, gradually advancing eastward, before being moved south in February 1944 to join 1st Ukrainian Front. After reaching its new Front, as part of 13th Army, the 162nd advanced to the vicinity of Brody, where it would remain for several months. In the early stages of the Lvov-Sandomierz offensive in July it assisted in taking this objective, then moved into southeast Poland, playing a leading role in forcing the Vistula and holding the bridgehead on its west bank. Following this success the division was pulled into reserve and moved to the north, briefly rejoining 65th Army before returning to 70th Army, now in 2nd Belorussian Front. During the Vistula-Oder offensive in 1945, as part of 47th Rifle Corps, it broke through to the lower Vistula and then into eastern Pomerania, where several of its subunits won decorations, including for the capture of Gdańsk. Following a rapid redeployment the 162nd helped lead its Front into central Germany north of Berlin. Shortly after the German surrender it was also awarded the Order of Suvorov, but was disbanded in July.

== 1st Formation ==
The division first began forming on July 16, 1940, at Artyomovsk in the Kharkov Military District. Its order of battle on June 22, 1941, was as follows:

- 501st Rifle Regiment
- 627th Rifle Regiment
- 720th Rifle Regiment
- 605th Light Artillery Regiment
- 634th Howitzer Artillery Regiment
- 141st Antitank Battalion
- 473rd Antiaircraft Battalion
- 241st Reconnaissance Battalion
- 187th Sapper Battalion
- 400th Signal Battalion (until October 18, 1941)
- 194th Medical/Sanitation Battalion
- 21st Chemical Defense (Anti-gas) Platoon
- 3rd Motor Transport Battalion
- 136th Field Bakery
- 169th Field Postal Station
- 119th Field Office of the State Bank

Col. Nikolai Fyodorovich Kolkunov was appointed to command on the day the division began forming, and he would remain in this post for the duration of the 1st formation. As of June 22 it was part of 25th Rifle Corps, along with the 127th and 134th Rifle Divisions, and was already on the move, by rail, to join the 19th Army at Cherkasy. From here the Army commander, Lt. Gen. I. S. Konev, was ordered north to the Vitebsk area, to join Western Front. Between July 7 and 10 the 162nd offloaded north of Smolensk.

=== Battle of Vitebsk ===
By late on July 9 forces of 3rd Panzer Group had created a serious breach in the Red Army's defenses around Vitebsk. The front commander, Marshal S. K. Timoshenko, ordered Konev to counterattack to restore the situation despite the fact his Army was not yet assembled. The 162nd took part in the counterattack the next day, which faltered after two days of heavy fighting due to the lack of coordination and reserves. By nightfall on July 12 both motorized corps of the Panzer Group were over the Dvina River and fanning out around Vitebsk. By the end of July 13 the 162nd and 134th were moving into the area east of Smolensk, but the remainder of 19th Army was strung out along the poor roads between that city and the area east of Vitebsk. 25th Corps was fighting in a salient east of Orsha which had been formed by XXXIX and XXXXVI Motorized Corps pushing toward Smolensk. Timoshenko continued to attempt to retake Vitebsk with counterattacks that included the 162nd as late as July 16, but these made no progress at all. Adding to the turmoil, the commander of the Corps, Maj. Gen. S. M. Chestokhvalov, had been captured on July 13.

== Battle of Smolensk ==
Timoshenko was not immediately aware that Army Group Center had taken Orsha and had completed an encirclement of Western Front's forces north of the Dniepr River, east of that city and west of Smolensk. The elongated pocket contained most of 20th Army, what remained of two mechanized corps, and five divisions of 19th Army, including all of 25th Corps, for a total of 20 divisions of several types. However, the rapid advance had taken a toll of the German forces as well, with the 18th Panzer Division, as an example, holding blocking positions with only 12 operable tanks on strength. Furthermore, German infantry divisions were still well to the rear. At 2000 hours on July 18 Timoshenko issued an operational summary to the STAVKA which stated, in part, that 19th Army was "withdrawing in disorder", and the 162nd was pulling back to the Nelidovo region, having escaped from the encirclement, and was now being subordinated to 30th Army. Following this, Colonel Kolkunov was brought in front of a military tribunal. He was accused of having, on July 13, ordered the division's communications equipment buried in the ground, and effectively destroyed, when this measure "was not required by the combat situation..." He was given a five-year suspended sentence but remained in command.

At 2000 hours on August 3 Timoshenko reported on Western Front's efforts to break through to relieve the still trapped 20th and 16th Armies near Smolensk. The 162nd had been re-subordinated to 19th Army, which was "attacking across its entire front", and the division was reported as being "concentrated in the Vadino region." By August 5 the combined remaining forces had escaped across the upper Dniepr to Western Front's positions, albeit at considerable cost. Konev's Army attacked again "against stubborn enemy resistance" starting at 0700 on August 7 and the 162nd was reported as having

reached the eastern edge of the woods (1 kilometre west of Ust'e) [28km north-northeast of Yartsevo] on its right wing and fighting in the forests west of Zaovrazh'e on its left wing.

By this time some 50,000 men of 16th and 20th Armies had escaped from the pocket. Also by this time most of the Front's rifle divisions had only 1,000 - 2,000 personnel on strength, with far fewer "bayonets" (riflemen and sappers).

=== Dukhovshchina Offensives ===
As of August 8 the divisions of XXXIX Motorized Corps which had been facing 30th Army had been relieved by the infantry divisions of 9th Army's V Army Corps. These divisions were very hard pressed to parry the attacks of this Army and 19th Army east and northeast of Dukhovshchina. In the wake of these assaults the commander of Army Group Center noted "9th Army was also attacked; the day before yesterday the Russians broke through as far as the 5th Division's artillery positions." The chief of staff of OKH, Col. Gen. F. Halder, noted on August 11 in regard to these attacks:

The whole situation makes it increasingly plain that we have underestimated the Russian colossus, who consistently prepared for war with that utterly ruthless determination so characteristic of totalitarian states... At the outset of war, we reckoned with about 200 enemy divisions. Now we have already counted 360. These divisions indeed are not armed and equipped according to our standards, and their tactical leadership is often poor. But they are there, and if we smash a dozen of them, the Russians simply put up another dozen.

Timoshenko's new plan, as submitted to the STAVKA around noon on August 15 was "to destroy the enemy grouping in the Dukhovshchina region" with shock groups consisting of 30th Army on the north flank and 19th Army on the south. The 162nd, which had returned to 30th Army, and 91st Rifle Divisions were initially assigned a covering role on a front between Markovo and Potelitsa, some 24-38km north of Yartsevo.

The operational directive set the goal of encircling and destroying the German 106th, 5th, and 28th Infantry Divisions and 900th Lehr Regiment through concentric attacks with two shock groups, the northern consisting of the 30th Army's 242nd, 251st, 107th Tank and 45th Cavalry Divisions, and by now the 162nd as well. The Army was to protect its right flank toward Bely with the 250th Rifle Division, penetrate the German defense and then commit the mobile forces to encircle the objective from the west. The attack sector was 17km wide from Markovo to Staroe Morokhovo, from 38km to 55km north of Yartsevo. The 162nd, which had the support of two battalions of the 542nd Cannon Artillery Regiment and other supporting units, was to attack with its main forces in the direction of Gordienki, Sechenki, and Maloe Repino, with the main objective to reach a line from Khadobuzha to Staroe Selo, and then continue the attack toward Ponomari. The attack was to be preceded by a 45-minute artillery preparation beginning at 0900 hours on August 17. The shock group faced the German 106th Infantry, which was holding a sector roughly 16km wide. During August 16 the 162nd was reported as having improved its jumping-off positions by reaching the area some 18-20km southeast of Staroe Morokhovo.

Maj. Gen. V. A. Khomenko, the Army commander, launched his attack on time, despite not all of his forces having managed to reach their jumping-off points. Several units were fed in piecemeal, which in some instances worked to their advantage, since the artillery preparation had done more to alert German units than it accomplished in causing damage. While 19th Army managed to penetrate the German tactical defenses throughout its sector, 30th Army achieved far more limited results due to intense machine gun and mortar fire, backed by effective artillery fire on most sectors. Most of the 162nd, in common with the 251st and 242nd, only advanced from 150m-400m, with the left wing regiment of the 162nd running up against a German strongpoint at Losevo, but the 107th Tanks, in cooperation with another regiment of the division, was successful in penetrating the defensive line and exploited roughly 4km deep, capturing a strongpoint at Karpovo. For several hours heavy fighting went on with reserve battalions of the 106th Infantry, which may have been reinforced by infantry of the 35th Infantry Division and tanks of 900th Lehr. These launched several unsuccessful counterattacks, but the Soviet advance was halted at Karpovo. At 2000 the Front reported that these counterattacks had "left 200 [German] bodies on the battlefield." Meanwhile, the 91st and 50th Rifle Divisions of 19th Army, just to the south, had torn a large hole in the defenses of the right wing of 161st Infantry Division.

The Army attempted to resume its offensive at 0900 on August 18, but Khomenko's evening report reveals very little progress:

162nd RD – 720th RR is fighting for Hill 218.7 against stubborn enemy resistance and well-organized defenses and fires and 627th RR is fighting in close combat amidst enemy gun positions on Hill 220.9. Division headquarters - on Hill 216.3.

Overall, although 19th Army continued to make some gains, the 30th could not say as much. In addition, German reserves, such as the 35th Infantry, were arriving in the sector. Although the 162nd and the 107th Tanks managed to cover another 2km on August 19, the remaining divisions stalled against heavy resistance, and the belated arrival of the reinforcing 244th Rifle Division did nothing to assist because it had not yet regrouped after its long approach march. The 45th Cavalry was now committed to exploit the limited success of the 162nd. Under the pressure of the offensive the German 9th Army had no choice but to call on the only available reserve, the 7th Panzer Division.

Army Group Center began its counterstroke on August 20. By noon 7th Panzer was concentrated north of Losevo with roughly 110 tanks (mostly Panzer 38(t) types), preparing to strike the right flank of 19th Army. This attack drove into the heart of the Army's antitank defenses and was driven off with significant losses. Meanwhile, 30th Army maintained its offensive pressure as best it could; Khomenko reported that the 162nd and 251st Divisions were fighting fiercely to widen the penetration in the Pochinoi 2 and Shelepy sector. The next day, as the dogfight with 7th Panzer continued, Timoshenko decided that, since it appeared that 30th Army's attacks were going nowhere, it would be more useful to transfer its fresh forces (45th Cavalry and 244th Rifle) to 19th Army's sector; on August 22 he permitted Khomenko to take a day to rest and refit. 19th Army resumed the attack on August 23 and 30th Army recorded some minor gains, with the division taking Hill 218.7 and Pochinok and then fortifying its positions while preparing to develop its success overnight with small reconnaissance and specialized detachments. However, by the end of the day word had reached Timoshenko that 22nd Army, which was supposed to be advancing south of Velikiye Luki, was in fact facing defeat from the forces of 3rd Panzer Group moving northward.

Despite this impending crisis, Stalin, the STAVKA, and Timoshenko remained confident that their armies could collapse Army Group Center's defenses east of Smolensk, and so persisted in their offensive operations. During August 24 the 162nd, reinforced with two rifle regiments and 30 tanks, attacked in the direction of Shelepy and Zareche before noon, but without success. The 251st Division was committed at 1600 hours, and the two divisions jointly pushed into Sechenki (some 45km north of Yartsevo) at 1640, where fighting continued. This advance forced a German withdrawal from Gorodno and Krechets, "taking the livestock and population with them."

On August 25 Timoshenko directed Khomenko to continue protecting the Bely axis with at least two regiments of the 250th Division while preparing to continue the offensive with most of the rest of his forces. At 0145 hours Khomenko dispatched a warning order to his subordinates which included:

162nd RD – (with 250th RD's 922nd RR and 237th [Motorized Rifle Regiment]) - attack toward Ivkino and Zarech'e to capture Malyi Fomenki and Ivkino and subsequently exploit toward Zarech'e to prevent the enemy from withdrawing toward the southwest.

Near the end of the day it was reported that the division was fighting to capture Hill 228.0 and Shelepy "against strong enemy resistance." This was part of a combined attack by the Army's five divisions on a 7km-wide sector against 106th Infantry Division which gained up to 2.5km and forced the German division back to its second defensive line. The assault resumed just past noon of the following day. The division was reported as fighting to capture Ivkino and Shelepy. Altogether, 30th Army forced the right wing of the damaged 106th Infantry to bend but not break, but at the cost to itself of 182 men killed and wounded. The heaviest fighting on August 28 occurred in the Shelepy area where the 251st and 162nd Divisions recorded advances of several hundreds of metres. The latter attacked toward Khomenki, and it reached the west slopes of Hill 228.9 with its right wing, while its left wing took an isolated building 1,000m southwest of Shanino. The Army lost another 453 men killed and wounded during the day. Khomenko issued orders for August 29 for the divisions to make a combined attack on Gorodno and to seize crossings over the Votra River. This would smash the right wing defenses of 106th Infantry. Just before midnight, Timoshenko gave further orders that, while continuing its attacks, 30th Army was to regroup during August 30–31 for a new general offensive.

==== Second offensive ====
On August 29 the division, in cooperation with 242nd and 250th Divisions, attacked but came up against heavy German fire, as well as fortifications in the form of barbed wire and minefields, halting the advance after minor gains. The following day it was ordered to capture Hill 230.3, Ploskoe, and, once again, Ivkino. In the process of regrouping, Khomenko formed a new shock group consisting of the 251st, 162nd and 242nd divisions, backed by the 250th and the artillery of 107th Tanks. Timoshenko, determined to carry out his design and press the advantages he had won, issued orders to Western Front to prepare to resume the offensive on September 1 after regrouping. 30th Army was directed to make its main attack toward Demidov, with the objective of reaching that place as well as Velizh by the end of September 8.

When the offensive officially resumed on September 1 the 162nd attacked toward Fomenki and Hill 230.3 without any success, falling back to its start line and bombarding German strongpoints for the rest of the day. During the day the Army lost 248 men killed and wounded. For the next day Khomenko ordered the division to consolidate on a narrow front overnight and then push "toward Shanino and Fomenki, while avoiding use of deeply echeloned combat formations, conduct a secondary attack toward Hill 229.1 and 241.2 together with 242nd RD, and conduct active demonstrative fires along the remainder of the front." Kolkunov's men again failed to advance. On September 3 the 162nd again attacked toward Ivkino but ran into heavy German fire resistance; overall 30th Army saw no success on this day. At 0230 hours on September 5 the division was ordered to withdraw into Army reserve, to be concentrated in the area of Lukashevo, Krapivnia, and Pochinok by September 6. In spite of this it went over to the attack again at 0800 with three other divisions, but this was unsuccessful at the cost of an additional 131 men. Finally, at 0335 on September 10 the STAVKA ordered Western Front to go over to the defense. The next day the division, in cooperation with the 251st, was ordered to firmly defend the Hill 228.0, Olkhovka, and Ilina Farm region (25–32km south of Chernyi Ruchei), with combat security positions along the Shelepy, Shanino Farm, 1,000m west of Sechenki, and western outskirts of Gorodno line to prevent German infantry and tanks from penetrating toward Savinka and Karpovo and protect the boundary with 244th Division.

== Operation Typhoon ==
The constant attacking had been costly in more than manpower. On September 20 Kolkunov reported that the division had on strength 32 heavy machine guns, 39 light machine guns, 12 45mm antitank guns, a mix of eight 76mm cannon and regimental guns, eight 122mm howitzers, three antiaircraft guns, and nine antitank rifles (which were only beginning to arrive at the front). The shortages even included the KS fuel used to make Molotov cocktails.

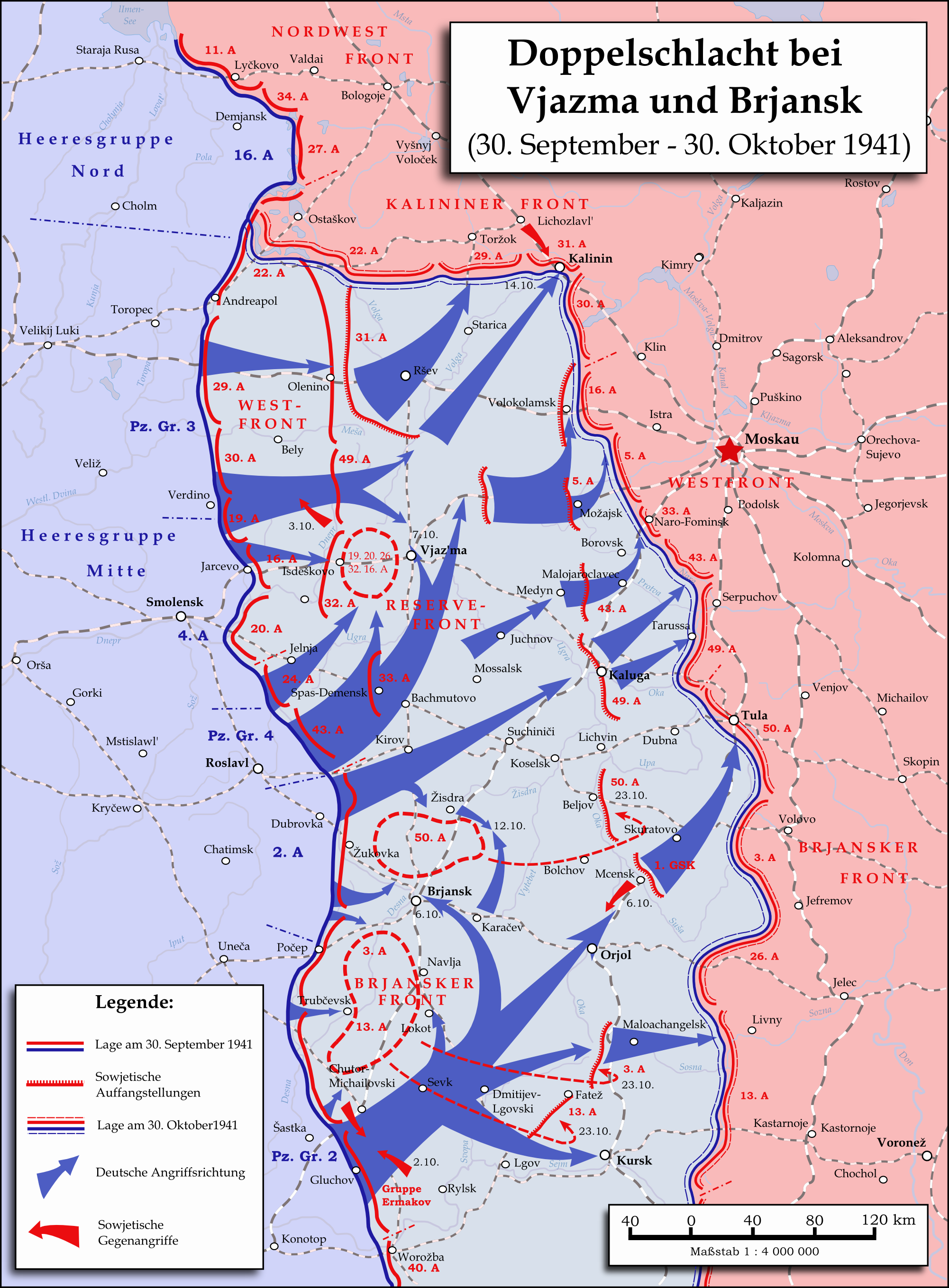
Operation Typhoon. Note the junction between 19th and 30th Armies.

The front west of Moscow was generally quiet through the balance of September as Army Groups Center and South focused on the encirclement and destruction of Southwestern Front east of Kyiv. Konev was promoted to the rank of colonel general on September 11 and took command of Western Front the next day. By the end of the month 30th Army was defending a 66km-wide sector with four divisions; 19th Army remained on its left (south) flank. General Khomenko correctly determined, due to the terrain, that the Kaniutino axis was likely where the main German attack would come. At the expense of a critical weakening of the Army's other sectors the 162nd was moved from reserve to deploy on this flank in two echelons on a frontage of only 6.5km, with one regiment of the 242nd also in the first echelon. The 251st Division was designated as the Army's reserve, backed by 107th Tanks (now redesignated as 107th Motorized Rifle) in Front reserve. Although the STAVKA believed the main German attack would come along the Smolensk–Vyazma highway, in fact it would be aimed at the 19th/30th Army boundary. According to plan, the boundary was to be covered by the fire of Khomenko's artillery battalions.

Khomenko decided to fire a preemptive artillery bombardment between 11.00 and 11.30 hours on October 1 in an effort to disrupt the German forces which, by then, were clearly massing against his left flank. The ravines in front of the 162nd's positions, which were sheltering German infantry, came under particular attention. While Khomenko's headquarters claimed significant damage had been inflicted, a good deal of the Army's available ammunition was also expended. Operation Typhoon began at 0530 hours on October 2, following a 45-minute artillery preparation, and the Army boundary was struck by 3rd Panzer Group and 9th Army as Khomenko expected. While the overall attack front was up to 45km wide the main breakthrough sector was only 16km wide. Overall, the Kaniutino axis was attacked by four German corps consisting of 12 divisions, including three panzer divisions (460–470 tanks) and one motorized division, simultaneously. The first echelon of the 162nd faced up to four regiments of infantry with approximately 200 tanks and some 100 aircraft in support, "hanging over the defense", suppressing strongpoints and artillery emplacements. At 13.30 the 30th Army headquarters reported that the 501st Rifle Regiment and the 897th Regiment of 242nd Division were "fighting in encirclement." Later in the day 9th Army reported an intercepted radio message from Khomenko to Konev's headquarters stating that the division had been forced to retreat by tank forces on both sides of Krapivnia. At 14.35, up to 40 German tanks were detected roughly 15km behind the front line.

Due to the 162nd having been concentrated in two echelons a gap of 1.5km between it and 19th Army's 244th Division was being covered by a single reconnaissance platoon. This Army, now led by Lt. Gen. M. F. Lukin, was relying on 30th Army to cover the boundary; his 244th was spread along a 13km-wide sector. This gap included good terrain for tanks and the breach of the Soviet lines was quickly expanded to the left and right. By the end of this first day the German forces had penetrated the defenses of the first echelon divisions at the inter-army boundary up to 15km in depth, and Konev was demanding that Khomenko restore the situation. At 1630 hours the latter issued his own order which stated in part:

2. The 251st Rifle Division – leaving up to one regiment on the Efremovo, Bogoliubovo front as cover and stubbornly defending the crossing on the Rekon' River, with its main forces in cooperation with the 162nd Rifle Division is to attack in the Lukashevo, Krapivnia direction.

The two divisions were to destroy the German units that had broken through, prevent further expansion of their lodgements, and restore the positions of the 162nd. Not only were these orders unrealistic, but the commitment of the 251st and 107th Motorized was delayed and piecemeal. Not only did the counterattack fail but the line of defense along the Vop River could not be held, and the Army's left flank divisions began to retreat to the east.

Konev resolved to stage a counterstroke against the penetration using Front reserves along with the 30th Army from the north and 19th Army from the south. His reserve commander, Lt. Gen. I. V. Boldin, ordered the formation of an operational group "to liquidate the enemy breakthrough on the Kaniutino axis and restore the 30th Army's position." The bulk of this force was located as far as 55km from the breakthrough area. Boldin's Group was largely intercepted by advancing German forces long before reaching its assembly areas. Meanwhile, the chief of the Vyazma garrison had reported at 0645 that 30th Army's headquarters had no contact with either the 251st or 162nd Divisions, although the 720th Rifle Regiment was believed to be in the Igorevskaya area.

The situation on the Bely axis deteriorated further after the failure of 30th Army's counterattack. The town fell on October 4, at which point 3rd Panzer Group pivoted to the east. The gap between 30th and 19th Armies was now as much as 40km wide. The main German encirclement was closed on October 7 near Vyazma, while the 251st, 162nd and 242nd Divisions were also pocketed separately east of Bely and north of Sychyovka. These passed to the control of 31st Army as 30th Army headquarters went into reserve. By October 9 an unknown number of men (described as "fragments") of the 162nd had been assembled near Barkovo, some 20km northwest of Rzhev.

As of October 10 the remnants of the 242nd, 162nd, and part of the 251st remained encircled by the German 6th and 110th Infantry Divisions west of the Rzhev–Vyazma road. Already, the 9th Army was so overstretched that it could not spare the manpower to mop up the pocket, which was simply surrounded by a thin cordon of detachments from various infantry divisions. After holding out for 15 days, the three divisions staged a successful breakout to the north on October 27, and reached the lines of 29th Army before the end of the month, covering some 75km and causing damage and confusion in the German rear. By the beginning of November the 162nd had returned to 30th Army, which was now part of Kalinin Front, but during the month it was broken up to provide replacements for other divisions. Colonel Kolkunov left his position on December 3, and the division was officially written off on December 27.

== 2nd Formation ==
The 434th Rifle Division began forming in December 1941 at Verkhny Ufaley, Chelyabinsk Oblast, in the Ural Military District. In January 1942 it was redesignated as the new 162nd Rifle Division. At this time its personnel were noted as being 70 percent Russian, 20 percent Ukrainian, and 10 percent other nationalities. Its order of battle was very similar to that of the 1st formation:

- 501st Rifle Regiment
- 627th Rifle Regiment
- 720th Rifle Regiment
- 605th Artillery Regiment
- 141st Antitank Battalion
- 136th Antiaircraft Battery
- 129th Mortar Battalion
- 241st Reconnaissance Company
- 187th Sapper Battalion
- 400th Signal Battalion
- 194th Medical/Sanitation Battalion
- 531st Chemical Defense (Anti-gas) Platoon
- 3rd Motor Transport Company
- 447th Field Bakery
- 912th Divisional Veterinary Hospital
- 1668th Field Postal Station
- 1039th Field Office of the State Bank

Lt. Col. Mitrofan Ilich Matveev had been appointed to command on December 1, 1941, would be promoted to full colonel on January 15, 1942, and would remain in this post for the duration of the 2nd formation. The division remained in the Urals, forming and training, into March, when it was assigned to 28th Army in the Reserve of the Supreme High Command. Moving west by rail it entered the active front on April 10.

== Second Battle of Kharkiv ==
28th Army, under command of Lt. Gen. D. I. Ryabyshev, also contained the 13th Guards, 38th, 175th, 169th, and 244th Rifle Divisions, plus a cavalry corps and four tank brigades.

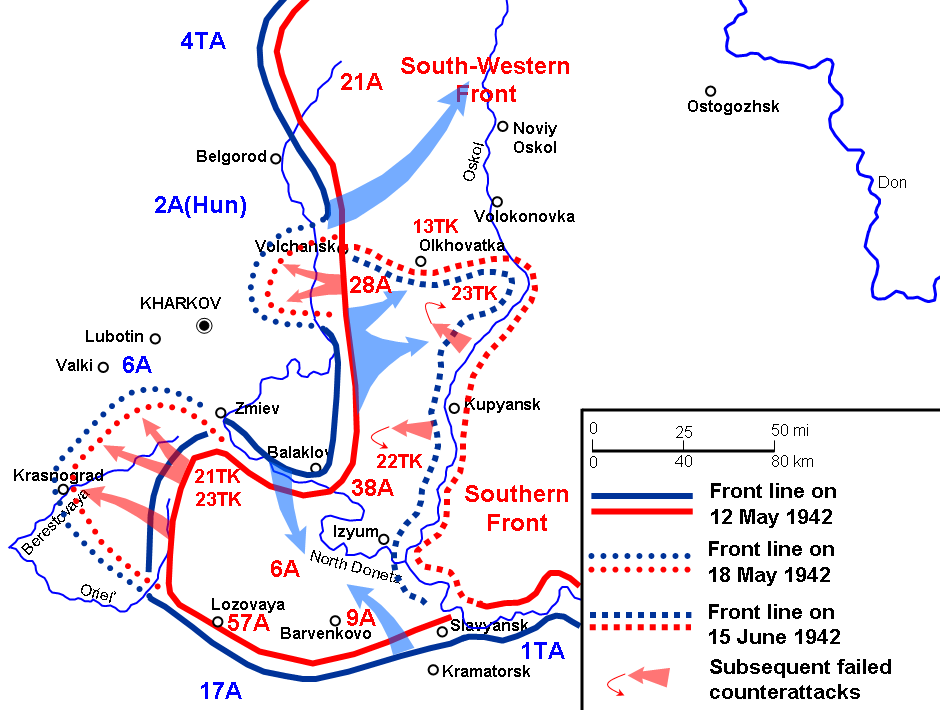
Second Battle of Kharkiv. Note position of 28th Army.

Marshal Timoshenko, who now commanded Southwestern Front, planned a new offensive to liberate Kharkiv with two shock groups. 28th Army formed the center of the northern group, with 21st Army to its north and 38th Army to its south. Ryabyshev's Army, located northeast of the city and with the bulk of the armor support, was expected to lead the advance. The 162nd, with the 38th, 6th Guards Tank Brigade, and the cavalry, formed the Army reserve and were deep in second echelon, with the 162nd and 6th Guards well east of Staryi Saltiv. The offensive opened at 0630 hours on May 12 with a 60-minute artillery preparation, followed by a 15-20 minute air attack against front line strongpoints and artillery positions. The first echelon infantry and tanks went over to the attack at 0730, but many German positions remained intact. In the event, 28th Army gained only 2–4km in heavy fighting through the day.

Overnight, the commander of Army Group South released the 23rd Panzer Division plus two infantry divisions to its 6th Army to join the depleted 3rd Panzer Division as a counterattack force. When combat resumed on the morning of May 13 Ryabyshev decided to develop the offensive on his left flank, taking advantage of the gains made by 38th Army the day before. Late in the day the 38th Division was ordered forward to maintain the encirclement of Ternovaya while the 175th and 169th Divisions continued to advance to the west. By the middle of the day disconcerting intelligence reports were reaching Ryabyshev about large concentrations of German armor and infantry massing east of Kharkiv. Early in the afternoon the German grouping struck 38th Army, and 13th Guards was ordered to form a defense facing south. During the night of May 13/14 the 162nd moved up to the east bank of the Northern Donets River and began crossing in the Verkhny Saltiv area.

Under the impact of the German counterattack against the left flank of 28th Army and 38th Army, on the morning of May 14 the 162nd and 6th Guards Tanks were seconded to the latter, which was under command of Maj. Gen. K. S. Moskalenko, and continued moving up to the front lines. Timoshenko moved the 277th Rifle Division from Front reserves to replace the division in 28th Army's second echelon, although it wasn't expected to arrive until May 17. In the early afternoon of May 15 Moskalenko's chief of staff reported to Front headquarters that the two panzer divisions, with infantry support, had renewed their attack. By day's end, however, this was halted due to casualties, including up to 50 tanks. Late in the day the 162nd was returned to Ryabyshev to reinforce his left flank and take up the defense of Peremoga–Gordienko sector.

On May 16, Timoshenko issued his Order No. 00317 which assigned new missions to the forces of 28th Army. Specifically, the three divisions on the left flank (13th Guards, 162nd, and 244th) were to strike in the direction of Hill 205 in order to disrupt the German forces that had penetrated to that point. Matveev's troops were given the leading role in this effort, supported by 6th Guards Tanks, one regiment of the 244th, and one regiment of the 38th Division. Among other issues this order ignored the fact that one regiment of the 244th was encircled at Ternovaya by 3rd Panzer and was being destroyed after the division had been routed. During May 17 Ryabyshev was forced to scramble to fill the gap left by the 244th; under the circumstances Matveev didn't receive any of the promised support. Nevertheless he went over to the attack from positions between Hill 218.6 and Peremoga, hitting the flank of 3rd Panzer and its supporting infantry. A group of tanks counterattacked from the Ternovaya area to hit the rear of the 162nd, but these in turn came under heavy fire from Soviet tanks and the antitank guns of 6th Guards Cavalry Division and forced to retreat after heavy losses. By this time the Front's southern shock group, and indeed all the Soviet forces in the Izium salient, were in danger of encirclement and destruction due to the counteroffensive launched the same day by 1st Panzer Army in the area of Barvinkove.

Overnight the 244th was sent to the rear; it would be disbanded within a few months. The ground between the 162nd and 169th was now held only by units of 5th Guards Cavalry Division. Captured documents now convinced Timoshenko that the two panzer divisions would change their attack axis to the southeast in an effort to link up with 1st Panzer Army. In order to prevent this he ordered the 28th and 38th Armies to continue offensive operations on May 18 with all available forces; 28th Army would be led by the 162nd supported by the 58th Tank Brigade. Despite the danger to the forces of Southwestern and Southern Fronts in the Barvinkove salient, Stalin refused to abandon the offensive on Kharkiv. 38th Army began its attack at 0700 hours, but due to organizational difficulties 28th Army did not get underway until 1130. The 169th Division was nailed down by air attacks. The 162nd made an initially successful advance, taking the area south of Vesele by 1600, but the inactivity of the 169th allowed the German forces to concentrate up to a regiment of infantry and some 45 tanks near the area without interference for a counterattack that began at 1900 against the division's flank and rear, forcing it back to its start line. Meanwhile, the shift of German forces allowed 38th Division to again encircle Ternovaya.

On May 19, 28th Army again went over to the attack at 0930 hours, as did the 38th Army, but with no greater success than the day before. In the afternoon in the 21st Army's sector the 168th Infantry Division struck the 293rd Rifle Division and drove it back from Murom. This forced General Ryabyshev to commit scant reserves to cover his flank and rear. Meanwhile, 3rd Panzer was indeed on the move, but contrary to Timoshenko's understanding it had moved through Lyptsi and was concentrating, along with the 57th Infantry Division, to the northwest of the main body of the 175th Division. Unaware of this, Ryabyshev ordered all his forces, except the 175th, to go over to the attack again at first light on May 20. The advance was initially successful until it ran into the positions of 23rd Panzer near Vesele. At noon a German counterattack was launched against the 175th and 169th. Under pressure of armor, and almost continuous air attacks, the two divisions began to withdraw to the east, uncovering the flank of 21st Army's 227th Rifle Division to the north. By the end of the day all the units along the boundary flanks of the two Armies had been forced back 10-15km with heavy losses. The northern shock group was now along a line from Murom to Ternovaya and then south along the west bank of the Bolshaya Babka River.

Having attained this success, 6th Army did not press the offensive on this sector, but instead began to withdraw the two panzer divisions back to Lyptsi as a preliminary to redeployment toward the Barvinkove salient, where the Soviet situation was going from bad to worse. During the following days the 21st, 28th, and 38th Armies were limited to local attacks to improve positions. Timoshenko soon ordered the 169th, 175th and 227th withdrawn from the front for rebuilding, along with all the tank brigades that had supported the northern shock group; as the 162nd had been committed late it had not suffered such heavy losses and remained in the front line. On the afternoon of May 22 the encirclement of the southern shock group and two armies of Southern Front was completed, and these forces were reduced and largely destroyed by the end of the month.

== Case Blue ==
By the beginning of June the division had been transferred to 38th Army, still in Southwestern Front. As a preliminary to Army Group South's summer offensive its 6th Army launched Operation Wilhelm on June 10 in order to gain positions on the east bank of the Northern Donets. The offensive primarily aimed at 28th Army to the north of the 38th, but the III Motorized Corps planned its breakthrough on the sector of the 38th's 277th Division. The Army was attempting to defend a 60km-wide sector from east of Chuhuiv to west of Izium with five divisions in the first echelon and two (the 242nd and 162nd) in reserve. III Corps punched through the Army's defenses in 24 hours before pushing north toward Velikie Burluk. The 168th Tank Brigade counterattacked the German left flank which opened an escape hatch for many fugitive of 28th and 38th Armies. This had been planned as part of a larger effort involving the 162nd and 278th Rifle Divisions, with four more tank brigades, but this failed due to lack of command and control and the 162nd suffered significant losses. By nightfall on June 15 the German pincers had met, and while 24,800 prisoners were taken, mostly from 28th Army, this was a smaller haul than expected.

On June 22 the 1st Panzer and 6th Armies launched Operation Fridericus II as a further preliminary offensive, this one much more directly aimed at 38th Army. The III Motorized Corps aimed at the boundary between the 242nd and the 162nd to its south in planning its drive on Kupiansk on the Oskil River. The Corps linked up with XXXXIV Army Corps by late afternoon on June 24 and the division was one of four to be encircled, along with the 199th, 278th, and 304th, and its remaining men were forced to attempt to slip through German lines while fighting continued for Kupiansk. Again, the total of prisoners taken was under the German expectations.

=== Operation Blau II ===
On July 6, the XXXX Panzer Corps of 6th Army launched an advance to the south which quickly covered 25km, almost halfway to Rossosh, but soon ran short of fuel. Despite this, a battle group of 3rd Panzer managed to seize the town at dawn the next day, which unhinged Southwestern Front's defenses. Timoshenko received permission from the STAVKA to withdraw 38th Army from its exposed positions. General Moskalenko later wrote in his memoirs:

Twenty-four hours after receipt of the order concerning 38th Army's withdrawal, it was withdrawn to that line [35-40km east of the Oskil]. However, by this time, the situation had once again changed, again for the worse.

On July 8 the XXXX Panzer Corps continued its southward advance with 100 tanks. This deep thrust threatened to envelop both 38th and 28th Armies, as well as many rear service elements of the Front.

Advancing headlong, XXXX Panzer reached the crossings over the Kalitva River, preempting a special combat group that 28th Army had formed to defend them, and in the process creating an even wider gap between that Army and the 38th. On July 8, the XXXX Panzer dispatched its three divisions, – which Moskalenko believed had a total of 300 tanks – southward into the gap toward Kantemirovka. Moskalenko requested permission to withdraw his forces farther east to the Aidar River, while a portion of his Army covered 28th Army's eastward escape. Timoshenko approved the latter but turned down the former. Moskalenko now formed a combat group consisting of the 304th, 199th, and 9th Guards Rifle Divisions, plus the 3rd Tank Brigade, and sent it northeast to form a protective screen between Rovenky and Kantemirovka. However, early on July 9 the panzers drove into the latter before the combat group could reach it.

The day before, a second large German axe had begun to fall on 38th Army, and indeed on the entire Southwestern Front. The commander of Army Group South, Field Marshal F. von Bock, realizing that 38th and 9th Armies were beginning to withdraw, authorized the infantry forces on 1st Panzer Army's right wing and center to advance across the Oskil and then eastward along the Northern Donets in pursuit. The XI and XXXXIV Corps soon advanced 10-15km eastward and reached the approaches to the Krasnaya River. The XIV Panzer Corps also attacked at dawn on July 9. Faced with mounting threats on both of his flanks, Moskalenko sent an urgent message to Timoshenko and the STAVKA, requesting they approve his further withdrawal. This was refused. To another message at 1600 hours he got no reply due to a communications failure, so at 2000 he issued withdrawal orders on his own authority.

In order to escape the Army's forces would have to cross a broad corridor carved out by XXXX Panzer Corps, which would prove impossible for most formed units, although many small groups and individuals had greater luck. Most of the Army was trapped between the Aidar and the Chertkovo Rivers. German intelligence identified the 162nd as part of the "bag", and while this assessment was exaggerated in a few other cases the 162nd was, in fact, officially disbanded on July 24. Colonel Matveev almost immediately took over command of the 333rd Rifle Division, ended the war leading the 92nd Guards Rifle Division, and was promoted to the rank of major general on July 11, 1945.

== 3rd Formation ==
The Central Asian Rifle Division of the NKVD began forming on November 15. This would become the 3rd formation of the 162nd. Its order of battle was almost completely different from the previous formations:

- 194th "Tashkent" Rifle Regiment
- 209th "Zaisan" Rifle Regiment
- 224th "Pamirsk" Rifle Regiment
- 369th Artillery Regiment
- 85th Antitank Battalion (later 85th Self-Propelled Artillery Battalion)
- 61st Reconnaissance Company
- 22nd Sapper Battalion
- 548th Signal Battalion (later 654th Signal Company)
- 79th Medical/Sanitation Battalion
- 20th Chemical Defense (Anti-gas) Platoon (later 531st)
- 330th Motor Transport Company
- 56th Field Bakery
- 11th Divisional Veterinary Hospital
- 2288th Field Postal Station
- 1829th Field Office of the State Bank

It was under command of NKVD Col. Sergei Mikhailovich Tarasov from November 15-24, who was then replaced by Col. Sergei Yakovlevich Senchillo. He was a Red Army officer who had previously led the 174th and 362nd Rifle Divisions. He would be promoted to the rank of major general on December 20. The personnel were largely NKVD border guards of Turkmen, Uzbek, and Kazakh nationalities. The division moved to Red Army command in the first days of February 1943 under the terms of this decree issued by Marshal G. K. Zhukov:

"The Stavka of the Supreme High Command orders:

1. Name the Separate Army formed by the People's Commissariat of Internal Affairs of the USSR, consisting of six rifle divisions, with separate reinforcing and support units, the 70th Army and include it in the Red Army on 1 February.
2. Give the formations of the 70th Army the following designations:

- The 102nd Far Eastern Rifle Division,
- The 106th Trans-Baikal Rifle Division,
- The 140th Siberian Rifle Division,
- The 162nd Central Asian Rifle Division,
- The 175th Ural Rifle Division,
- The 181st Stalingrad Rifle Division

3. Determine the numbering and table of organization and composition of the units of 70th Army in accordance with the instructions of the Chief of the Red Army Glavupraform."

The 162nd had already loaded aboard trains and was moving west.

=== Sevsk-Trubchevsk Offensive ===
70th Army was assigned to the re-deploying Don Front (soon re-designated Central Front) under command of Col. Gen. K. K. Rokossovskii. It took some time before Rokossovskii could knock it into shape as a front-line formation, forcing him to remove many senior, ex-NKVD officers. Rokossovskii had received detailed instructions from the STAVKA early on February 6, directing him to, among other things, concentrate 70th Army's units by February 14 in the Volovo, Dolgorukovo, and Livny areas as they arrived and then send them off in the wake of the Front's first echelon. In the event, this deployment schedule was impossible to meet, due to shortages of rolling stock, damage to the rails themselves, and winter weather, so the start of Central Front's offensive was postponed until February 25.

At the same time, Rokossovskii made changes in his operational plan. In the first phase, Central Front would break through the German line from Nikolskoe to Karmanovo to Mashkino to Olshanka with the objective of reaching the rail line from Bryansk to Konotop. After this, the axis of the attack would be toward Sevsk and Unecha Station to cut the line from Bryansk to Gomel. This first phase would require covering up to 250km through deep snow and with a paucity of roads. 70th Army would join in the second phase, with the objective of capturing Mogilev by March 28 after concentrating in the Kursk area on February 23. These ambitious objectives proved well beyond the Army's capabilities. On February 24 Rokossovskii's chief of operations reported, in part, that the Army had largely completed unloading and was proceeding on two march routes, with the 175th, 162nd and 106th approaching Kolpny with the rear of the column passing through Livny. He also reported that each division contained 9,000-11,000 personnel, but up to 75 percent of authorized horses were missing, and there were no tractors at all for the 122mm howitzers in the artillery regiments, so they had to remain where they had been unloaded.

The strategic situation was changing by this time. Already on February 20 the XXXX Panzer Corps of Army Group South had struck the advancing forces of Southwestern Front, scoring immediate gains in the Barvinkove area. A few days later, further overextended mobile formations were destroyed by XXXXVIII Panzer Corps and the SS Panzer Corps. The STAVKA was slow to acknowledge the situation, expecting Rokossovskii's anticipated advance to make the setbacks irrelevant. This began as planned on February 25 as Central Front continued to take advantage of the weaknesses along the boundary of 2nd and 2nd Panzer Armies. The Front was led by 2nd Tank, 13th, and 65th Armies as 70th Army was still two days to the rear. German resistance at Dmitriev-Lgovsky was determined, so the 11th Tank Corps swung southward to bypass the town and drove headlong toward Sevsk, more than 50km to the west.

Rokossovskii's armies had achieved significant success by March 1. 65th Army had pushed a deep salient toward Komarichi and Trosna, and despite the arrival of 78th Infantry Division the next day the Army commander, Lt. Gen. P. I. Batov, remained confident as 70th Army arrived in his support; the 162nd was now some 30km south of the latter place. Dmitriev-Lgovsky had been abandoned, but the garrison began a fighting withdrawal, covering the road to Bryansk, and the rate of advance in the center slowed. The direction also changed from Sevsk–Trubchevsk and more toward Komarichi and Lokat, where German reserves were gathering. During the next five days Central Front made only marginal gains in the center and on the right. On the left much greater (and somewhat misleading) progress was made as 70th Army more fully joined the 65th against the defenses of 76th Infantry and 12th Panzer Divisions on the southern approaches to Oryol. Under Rokossovskii's urgings, the commander of 70th Army, Maj. Gen. G. F. Tarasov, pushed his forces against Trosna without success and at high cost, and it became apparent to all no further advance was possible without additional reinforcements.

=== Oryol Offensive ===
These began arriving in the form of 21st Army from Stalingrad. Determined not to repeat the mistake he made in committing 70th Army piecemeal, Rokossovskii gave it several days to fully assemble around Fatezh before reinforcing Batov and Tarasov. Finally, in the last days of February the STAVKA began to grasp the gravity of the situation created by Army Groups South's counterstroke south of Kharkiv, and began shifting the flow of reserves which had been intended for Central Front. At 2130 hours on March 7 Rokossovskii's mission was changed. Instead of striking deeply at Bryansk and beyond he was to cooperate with Western and Bryansk Fronts in encircling and defeating the German forces in the salient around Oryol:

... 2. Turn the forces of General Batov's, Tarasov's, and Chistiakov's armies from the west toward the north and northeast, with the missions to destroy the enemy's Dmitrovsk-Orlovskii group of forces and cut the railroad line between Briansk and Orel somewhere east of Karachev with the combined forces of these armies and, by doing so, help the Briansk Front liquidate the enemy's Orel group of forces.

The 2nd Tank, 65th and 70th Armies would deploy left to right along the Usozha River with 21st Army joining as soon as possible.

Rokossovskii sent out his orders for the revised plan in the afternoon of March 8, and these expected an early arrival of 21st Army. Tarasov was directed to continue its advance on the morning on March 9 "in the general direction of Volobuevo, Apal'kovo, and Naryshkino" and subsequently capture a series of lines before taking the Oryol region in conjunction with 21st Army around March 14. The 162nd was still lagging behind the Army's first echelon, although it closed up somewhat by March 10. On the same day the 65th and 2nd Tank Armies made gains, but 2nd Panzer Army began to receive reserves and 70th Army stalled. Meanwhile, the changing situation was producing command confusion within STAVKA; effective March 12 Bryansk Front was disbanded, with three armies shifted to Central Front. The following day a new Reserve Front was established. On March 14 two infantry divisions of 2nd Army began a counterattack east of Hlukhiv against a thin screen on the left flank of Central Front which soon put 2nd Guards Cavalry Corps in an untenable position. Rokossovskii had few options available. An attack by 16th Army north of Oryol had utterly failed, his own progress was minimal, and Army Group South had renewed its offensive against Voronezh Front south of Kharkiv, which had fallen on March 15. As the panzers moved north, Central Front was in jeopardy. 21st Army was reassigned to Voronezh Front, which ended any possibility that Rokossovskii could successfully continue his offensive, although he continued limited operations until March 21.

On April 4 Rokossovskii issued a long decree in which he extensively critiqued the performance of 70th Army and requested that the STAVKA relieve General Tarasov of his command. He focused on fighting in the second half of March for the villages of Svetlyi Luch, Novaia Ialta, Rzhavchik, Muravchik and Hill 260.2 which led to losses of 8,849 personnel killed and wounded, as well as a good deal of equipment. He blamed this, first, on inadequate reconnaissance and poor provision of artillery support. Lack of cooperation with supporting tanks was also noted. Specific to the 162nd he condemned the performance of its chief of staff:

b. The supervision of the fighting on 28 March 1943 in the 162nd Rifle Division was extremely unsatisfactory, and the chief of staff of the division, while remaining in his CP [Command Post], was in fact eliminated from participation in the organization of the fighting and from control over the fulfillment of the order, and, as a result, both the information about the enemy and also about the situation of his own forces sent to the headquarters of the army from the CP of the commander of the division turned out to be implausible and disoriented.

Tarasov was soon relieved of command, being replaced by Lt. Gen. I. V. Galanin.

== Battle of Kursk ==
70th Army remained along the line it had gained in March through the rest of the spring and into July. This formed the northwestern corner of the Kursk salient, with 65th Army on its left flank and 13th Army on its right. By late April the STAVKA had decided to go over to the strategic defensive and prepare for a German offensive against the salient, which all intelligence indicated was in the works. The preparation of extensive fortifications was put in hand. The reinforced 70th Army occupied a sector 62km in length. It was not expected to come under attack initially except along its boundary with 13th Army, as the German forces were considered most likely to launch a classic pincer movement against the bases of the salient. However, one variant considered possible by Rokossovskii was a main attack on 70th Army's front in the direction of Fatezh and Kursk.

German plan of attack at Kursk. Note position of 70th Army.

As of July 5, when the offensive began, Galanin had eight rifle divisions under his command, plus three tank regiments, ten artillery and mortar regiments, and an antitank brigade. The 162nd had just come under command of the 19th Rifle Corps joining the 106th and 102nd Divisions, and was in the Army's second echelon, along with the 175th and 132nd Rifle Divisions. The tank regiments were grouped behind the right flank where the German attack was most likely. Galanin had placed his headquarters in the woods north of Radogoshcha.

At 0210 hours Rokossovskii ordered an artillery counter-preparation along his Front's right wing. This lasted 20 minutes with mixed results, but delayed the start of the offensive between 1 1/2 and 2 hours. The German artillery preparation began at 0430. The main attack of German 9th Army was directed at Olkhovatka, but a secondary thrust by elements of XXXXVI Panzer Corps (7th Infantry and 20th Panzer Divisions) was made at the boundary of 13th and 70th Armies at Gnilets. This struck the 132nd and 280th Rifle Divisions but made only marginal gains. However, a group of tanks and motorized infantry managed to penetrate the left flank of 13th Army and got into the rear of the 132nd. Later in the day this division began to fall back under renewed pressure from XXXXVI Corps. However, German losses were very high and the Soviet line remained intact.

Fighting along Central Front's line continued through July 6-7, until Rokossovskii declared to his army commanders that "We have won the defensive battle, and our new mission is to finish off the defeated enemy by the launching of a decisive offensive." The next day, in an effort to revive the offensive, another large German grouping launched heavy attacks against the boundary of 13th and 70th Armies near Samodurovka. More than 200 tanks and self-propelled guns were committed to the attack. The 140th suffered heavy losses and fell back to the south. However, the 175th and neighboring 70th Rifle Division closed off the breach created by the retreat and cut off the tanks and infantry that had infiltrated. These tanks attempted several times to regain contact with their main forces, but gradually fell victim to antitank units. This ended the German offensive along this sector and the former attackers began to dig in.

=== Operation Kutuzov ===
The Western and Bryansk Fronts went over to the offensive against the Oryol salient on July 12. On the same day Rokossovskii ordered his Front to be ready to go over to the attack on July 15. Apart from the 13th, his armies had emerged relatively unscathed from the defensive battle. 70th Army, with the 19th Tank Corps, was to hold a line from Katomki to Shepelevo to Verkhnyaya Grankina to Chern using three divisions while the remaining forces were to attack from Teploe to Muravl. They were first to destroy the forces of 9th Army that had penetrated the Front's positions and regain the original line by the end of July 17. Following this, they were to continue to advance in the general direction of Oryol. In the first phase the 70th was to specifically cooperate with 13th and 48th Armies, as well as 16th Air Army.

On the first day, in common with most of the Front, Galinin's forces only made slight gains. The following morning, units on his right wing defeated the German grouping in the area of Height 250 and reached the area of Gnilets. German resistance was stubborn, based on covering detachments of infantry and tanks (some disabled from the earlier fighting) as the main forces fell back to their July 5 jumping-off positions. These had been well prepared over months and the German command expected to halt the offensive here.

The commander of 9th Army, Gen. W. Model, demanded that his troops maintain these positions, but Central Front's right wing armies maintained their momentum and on July 21 broke through the line along the Ochka River before pushing onward toward Kamenets and Kromy. During the following 10 days the 13th and 70th Armies made a steady advance despite desperate counterattacks. By the end of August 1 they had reached a line from Nadezhda to Krasnikovo while continuing the march on Kromy. On August 4, elements of Bryansk Front's 3rd Army liberated Oryol. The right wing armies of Central Front took Kromy on August 6 and by the end of August 11 had reached a line from Mytskoe to outside Dmitrovsk-Orlovskii. This town was taken the next day, and by August 17-18 a line from Glybochka to Terekhovka to Uporoi had been reached. This line contained previously prepared positions in some depth (the Hagen Line), and during the following days the advance slowed considerably. At about this time the 162nd was transferred, with 19th Corps, to 65th Army, still in Central Front.

== Into Ukraine and Belarus ==
Central Front struck 2nd Army's center at Sevsk and east flank at Klintsy on August 26. The Front's forces quickly broke the German line with 60th Army in the lead. On September 2 the XIII Army Corps was ordered to fall back to the west and maintain contact with Army Group South, but instead was pushed south across the Seym River into the 4th Panzer Army sector, thereby opening a 30km wide gap between Army Groups South and Center. The following day, 2nd Army withdrew to the Desna River as General Rokossovskii paused to regroup. On September 9 the Front's forces forced this river south of Novhorod-Siverskyi and at Otsekin. In relation to this advance the division was awarded one of the early battle honors:

NOVGOROD-SEVERSKII – ... 162nd Rifle Division (Major General Senchillo, Sergei Yakovlevich)... The troops that participated in the liberation of Novgorod-Severskii, by order of the Supreme Commander-in-Chief of 16 September 1943 and a commendation in Moscow, are given a salute of 12 artillery salvoes by 124 guns.

=== Gomel-Rechytsa Offensive ===
On October 1 the division was still in 19th Corps, along with the 37th Guards, 140th, and 354th Rifle Divisions. The Corps, along with most of 65th Army, was facing the XX Army Corps of 2nd Army. Over the next two days the 65th, and 61st Army to the south, reached the Dniepr River on a sector some 70km wide from south of Gomel to west of Dubrovka. The 102nd Division, now on the extreme left (south) flank of 48th Army, linked up with 19th Corps as it prepared to force a crossing of the Sozh River. The 354th had already taken a small bridgehead over the Sozh from the German 6th Infantry Division, and Batov quickly reinforced this with a handful of tanks. His immediate objective was to expand this lodgement and force Army Group Center to abandon Gomel. To this end he pushed the 37th Guards and 140th into the bridgehead and went over to the attack on October 1. By late the next day the depth of the holding had increased to 4km in heavy fighting, but the commitment of reserves from 216th Infantry Division brought 19th Corps to a halt, even after Batov countered by committing the 162nd. The town of Zherebnaya, which controlled the southern approaches to Gomel, remained in German hands.

By October 20, 65th Army's attacks had bogged down on this sector, and the offensive towards Gomel was temporarily halted. Central Front was now redesignated as Belorussian Front. On the same date General Senchillo left the division, being replaced the next day by Col. Stepan Ivanovich Chernyak. Senchillo soon took over the 102nd Division for a brief period, and ended the war as assistant head of the Military Mission to Poland. Chernyak had been made a Hero of the Soviet Union in April 1940 for his leadership on the 136th Rifle Division during the Winter War with Finland. Shortly after the start of the German invasion he took command of the new 46th Army in the Transcaucasus, but in December 1941 was sent to Sevastopol to lead the Separate Coastal Army. This assignment was over his head and he was recalled in February 1942 to take command of 44th Army with the rank of lieutenant general, but this force was effectively destroyed in May during Battle of the Kerch Peninsula. In June he was demoted to the rank of colonel, and was sent to lead the 306th Rifle Division, where he was seriously wounded. After recovering he was given command of the 32nd Rifle Division, but had been removed from command in late August.

Previously, on October 15, an attack by forces on the left wing of the Front forced a passage across the Dniepr in the area of Loyew and gained ground fast; by October 20 the Soviet forces had carved out a bridgehead 90km wide and 16km deep on the river's west bank and went on to try to cut the rail line from Rechytsa to Gomel. Heavy fighting raged for more than a week until 2nd Army was forced to begin a phased withdrawal to new positions in the rear. By October 28, 27th Rifle Corps had linked up with 61st Army northwest of Loyew but the forces of both armies had by now "shot their bolt", and a halt was called on October 30. During the following 10 days the Front carried out a major regrouping, with 65th Army displacing to the south to enter the Loyew bridgehead with most of its forces. Batov's troops were deployed in the center of the bridgehead with 19th Corps in the center of the Army. The 162nd and 37th Guards were in first echelon on a 5km-wide sector from Lipniaki to west of Bushatin, with 140th Division in second echelon and 18th Rifle Corps on the right. The immediate objective was to pierce the defenses between Gansharov Podel and Budishche to a depth of 5km, along the junction between XX Corps' 2nd Panzer and 31st Infantry Divisions.

The renewed offensive began on November 10. In the first three days Rokossovskii's forces tore a gap some 15km wide and 8-12km deep in the defenses from west of Uborok to the Dniepr north of Velin, putting them halfway to Rechytsa. 19th Corps was supported by the lead brigades of 1st Guards Tank Corps and 7th Guards Cavalry Corps and, together with 27th Corps, carved out the penetration that could then be exploited into the operational rear by the mobile forces beginning late on November 12. Before long two brigades of 1st Guards Tanks were racing to the north with all three divisions of 19th Corps following closely. Heavy street fighting began in Rechytsa on November 15. The city was defended by the 203rd Security Division, along with withdrawing elements of 45th and 36th Infantry Divisions. The two rifle corps continued marching northward past the city in an effort to reach Parychy, some 80km farther on. 37th Guards reached the Berezina River near Gorval, flanked by the 162nd and 140th, early on November 20, and the Guardsmen even took a small bridgehead on the west bank. Rechytsa was largely abandoned the same day. Even before this, on November 18 the 162nd was recognized for its success in the offensive with the award of the Order of the Red Banner.

The taking of Rechytsa and the bridgehead over the Berezina threatened the flanks of both XXXV Army Corps, still defending Gomel, and the positions of 9th Army along the Sozh. Rokosovskii's bold thrust would have to be reinforced before 9th and 2nd Armies could bring up forces to cut it off. Between November 23-30 another regrouping took place, in which the 140th and 162nd were moved north to join 18th Rifle Corps north of Kalinkavichy, while 19th and 27th Corps were reinforced with other units to continue the northward advance. This would lead to considerable back-and-forth fighting in the vicinity of Svyetlahorsk.

==== Kalinkavichy Offensive ====
In early December Rokossovskii was still planning to reach Babruysk in accordance with his directives from the STAVKA. However, by this time a firm German defense had been formed around Kalinkavichy and until this could be shifted or destroyed there was no prospect of reaching Babruysk. In addition, he was about to lose forces to 1st Ukrainian Front to the south. The Kalinkavichy grouping, which was also holding Mazyr, was faced by 65th and 61st Armies. The five divisions of 18th and 95th Rifle Corps were up against the 5th Panzer and 292nd Infantry Divisions of LVI Panzer Corps, holding positions from Mnogoversh southward to the Rechytsa–Kalinkavichy road. Furthermore the 1st Guards Tanks had been sent to the rear for rest and refitting.

The offensive began on December 8. Rokossovskii deliberately weakened his right wing by leaving 19th Corps to hold along the Berezina; 69th Rifle Division was moved from 18th Corps to 95th Corps. The three divisions of this Corps would attack along with the remaining 162nd and 193rd Rifle Divisions of 18th Corps "to attack Kalinkovichi from the Novinki, Nakhov, and Vasilevichi region," penetrate the defenses, and take the city. This defense was provided primarily by 5th Panzer. The attack began at 0900 hours and the 162nd struck Group Schmidthuber of 5th Panzer, broke through its forward positions and drove the defenders back some 4km to the outskirts of Kholodniki and Buda. The remainder of the attackers had mixed results. The following day, 5th Panzer sent reserves that contained 95th Corps, while the 162nd and 193rd took another 5km from that division, capturing Buda and reaching the northern outskirts of Ubolot. Despite these successes the 65th Army's offensive came to an abrupt halt on December 11. The question that remained the next day was whether or not Rokossovskii could hold onto the breach between the two German armies long enough to mount yet another effort toward Kalinkavichy and Babruysk.

==== Kalinkavichy-Mazyr Offensive ====
The STAVKA set the stage for the next effort on January 2, 1944, by adjusting the boundaries between Belorussian and 1st Ukrainian Fronts. The objectives remained as previously, but now explicitly included Mazyr. 1st Guards Tanks was released from its refit. Rokossovskii planned a double envelopment of the Kalinkavichy-Mazyr grouping, which now included LVI Panzer and XX Army Corps, plus Corps Detachment E. While this seemed to be a sufficient force, the infantry divisions had been reduced to regimental-sized battlegroups (Detachment E was an amalgamation of divisional remnants) while the 4th and 5th Panzers had a combined total of 79 serviceable tanks. The Red Army divisions were also at a low ebb of strength after months of fighting. 65th Army was to conduct the main attack from north and east of Kalinkavichy with 18th Corps to the north. The 162nd and 69th would be in first echelon with orders to take the strongpoints at Nizhne- and Verkhne-Kozlovichi respectively, creating conditions for the 37th Guards to be introduced from second echelon, followed by 1st Guards Tanks, although this was still under strength, with 113 T-34 tanks, plus nine SU-85 and 18 SU-76 self-propelled guns.

The offensive began on January 8 with an artillery preparation of between 40 and 45 minutes prior to the assault troops advancing at 0940 hours. The men of 18th Corps immediately ran into heavy German resistance and were halted after just limited gains. 69th Division wedged some 2km into the defenses and took a pair of hills on the first day, but the 162nd failed completely and remained in its jumping-off positions. The next day the 69th gained some 300m-500m in the face of armored counterattacks and the 37th Guards also had some success, but the 162nd remained stuck. On January 10 Rokossovskii critiqued his commanders at Batov's command post for having used "stereotypical tactics", particularly in the deployment of artillery. The 1st Guards Tanks was committed on the sector of the 69th on January 11, despite Rokossovskii's misgivings. This was supported by the 4th Artillery Penetration Corps and 16th Air Army. Preceded by waves of Katyusha fire the tanks collapsed the first and second German lines with the infantry in their wake. By day's end the tanks had advanced 15km-18km and captured 15 village strongpoints from the two panzer divisions, while five rifle divisions, including the 162nd, were advancing in line abreast from the Svyetlahorsk–Kalinkavichy road to the Ipa River.

With the left flank of 2nd Army collapsing north of Kalinkavichy the two panzer divisions were ordered to hold back Batov's advance while arrangements were made to withdraw to a new defense line along the Ipa. Overnight on January 12/13 the commanders and senior staff of 1st Guards Tanks were congratulated by Batov, who issued orders at 0300 hours for the final assault on the city. This would be carried out by 105th Rifle Corps and the tanks, while 18th Corps wheeled to the west, forced the retreating German troops back to the Ipa, and take bridgeheads near Kaplichy, Krotov, and Yakimovichy.

==== Ozarichy-Ptsich Offensive ====
By first light on January 13 the 4th and 5th Panzers were already beginning their retreat. At the same time the XX Corps abandoned Mazyr and Kalinkavichy, falling back to positions along the Ipa some 12km-15km to the west. At the same time the 18th Corps pursued 4th Panzer and reached the river from north of Kaplichy to south of Yakimovichy. 1st Guards Tanks entered Kalinkavichy at 0400 hours on January 14, finding it empty of German troops, linking up with elements of 61st Army, while Batov regrouped the bulk of his forces to join 18th Corps at and beyond the Ipa. This would set the stage for the second phase of Rokossovskii's offensive plan. By January 15 the 162nd had returned to 19th Corps, still in 65th Army.

After this and other regroupings the offensive was to resume on January 16. 65th Army was to attack on a 25km-wide sector along the Ipa, from Kaplichy to the Koreni region, some 10km east of Ozarichy. The immediate objective was to drive 2nd Army back across the Ptsich River by attacking the weak 707th Security Division and part of 4th Panzer, leading to the capture of Ozarichy. 105th Corps was in the rear of 18th and 19th Corps to serve as a second echelon. Although 4th Panzer by now had only about 20 tanks in operation, 1st Guards Tanks would remain in the rear until January 27 for refitting.

Batov kicked off with the 18th and 19th Corps, striking at the boundary between the two German divisions. 19th Corps deployed its 115th Rifle Brigade, 82nd, and 162nd Divisions from left to right, aiming at the strongpoints at Kaplichy, Novoselki, and Tsidov before advancing 5km-10km into the rear to envelop the defenses at Ozarichy from the south. This mission would be complicated by the terrain, which featured heavy forests and numerous unfrozen swamps, streams and rivers. An overnight long-range patrol revealed that battalion groups from 35th Infantry were arriving to reinforce the 707th. In the first two days the 82nd gained some 6km, scattering much of the 707th in the process, but the 162nd managed only about 3km against tougher resistance, taking Tsidov but being halted at Zamoshchany. 4th Panzer's reconnaissance battalion managed to form a light defensive screen extending from this place to the Ipa, tying in to the main body of 35th Infantry. Meanwhile the 115th Brigade and 82nd Division failed to take Kaplichy. During January 18-19 the 162nd took Zamoshchany, forced the reconnaissance troops to pull back to the north, and reached the southern outskirts of Syshchychy, just 4km south of Ozarichy.

115th Brigade was moved to the 162nd's right flank, near Syshchychy, while the 132nd Rifle Division took up second echelon positions in 19th Corps' rear, but it was soon wedged in between the 162nd and the 82nd. The immediate objective would be to break the defense along the Visha River and take Savichy. The advance resumed on the morning of October 20, and the Corps made gains along the road leading to Ozarichy over two days, before running into heavy opposition, including counterattacks with tanks. On the first day Colonel Chernyak was again seriously wounded and hospitalized. He was replaced by Col. Lazar Vasilevich Grinvald-Mukho. After his recovery Chernyak would be given command of the 41st Rifle Division and he would lead this into the postwar. By the end of January 22 the 65th and 61st Armies had jointly torn a hole in the defenses between the two panzer divisions some 15km wide and 12km deep, and neither 9th nor 2nd Armies had available forces to restore their fronts. 61st Army had its 9th Guards Rifle Corps in reserve, ready to enter the gap, and Rokossovskii now ordered Batov to commit the 18th, 19th and 27th Corps to complete to penetration by taking Ozarichy and Savichy. During January 22-25 these continued pounding away from Ozarichy to Krotov. 19th and 18th Corps attacked repeatedly on a sector from Dubniaky to Syshchychy, but largely without result.

In an effort to keep his operation alive, Rokossovskii created a new shock group at the junction of the 18th and 19th Corps. This consisted of the 69th, 82nd, and 162nd, with the support of the 193rd and 251st Tank Regiments and was to attack at the boundary of the 4th Panzer and 35th Infantry in an effort to break through from the Visha northwest toward Kryukovichy and Savin Rog. The group was backed by a second echelon of the 132nd, 253rd, and 75th Guards Rifle Divisions of 105th Corps. A successful penetration was to converge on Savichy from the south and east. This began on January 25 and made little initial progress against heavy artillery and mortar fire. After a quick reorganization on January 26 the attack was resumed the next day and broke the defense of LVI Panzer Corps on a 5km front, taking Kryukovichy while the forward detachments of the shock group pushed about 3km deep. The next day the 132nd and 253rd were also committed and the attack was approaching Savin Rog some 6km inside the original German lines. However, the attackers were now running up against the newly-arriving 110th Infantry Division from 9th Army.

The 110th counterattacked on January 29 but failed to close the gap in the German lines. Batov's forces now spread out in an effort to expand the width of the penetration. 19th Corps was reinforced with the 132nd, 253rd, and 75th Guards and fanned out to the west and east to take the ground north of Savichy as well as Syshchychy. By the end of January 31 the latter town had been freed along with Kryukovichy and a salient some 12km wide and 6km deep hung over Savichy from the north. 4th Panzer had no choice but to withdraw from this position on February 4. By this time Rokossovskii had concluded that this wing of his Front was no longer capable of operational or even tactical successes, and he halted the operation. At about this time the 162nd's personnel were reported as being about 35 percent Ukrainian, 35 percent Kazakh, 20 percent Russian, and 10 percent of other nationalities, with 50 percent from the 1923 year group. After an unsuccessful attack on February 13/14 the division was withdrawn to the rear for replenishment, after which it was moved south to join 1st Ukrainian Front, coming under direct command of 13th Army, although in March it was assigned to that Army's 27th Rifle Corps.

== Into Western Ukraine and Poland ==
In early January the right flank of this Front, led by 13th and 60th Armies, renewed its advance west of Kyiv, with the former moving in the direction of Rivne. This city could be used as a base for further operations toward Lublin and Lviv. Rivne was taken on February 2 and as the 162nd began to arrive the left flank of Army Group South was falling apart, but the situation was stabilized by March 2.

=== Kamenets–Podolsky Pocket ===
On March 5 the 13th Army attacked west between Lutsk and Dubno, and 1st Panzer Army was forced back to the south away from Shepetivka. By the next day a gap some 140km wide had been driven between 1st and 4th Panzer Armies, but the Soviet advance began to slow, in part due to lack of fuel. Despite this, the 13th cleared both Lutsk and Dubno on March 16. The previous day the 27th Corps, with the 1st and 6th Guards Cavalry Corps and 25th Tank Corps, struck toward Brody. This city had been declared a "fortress" by Hitler on March 8, and although it was outflanked to the north the garrison was able to hold out as Soviet objectives were deflected to the south.

=== Lvov-Sandomierz Offensive ===
On July 8 Colonel Grinvald-Mukho left the division and was replaced by Col. Anatolii Olegovich Muratov. This officer had previously led the 65th Motorized Rifle Brigade of 31st Tank Corps in the Vinnytsia area, winning the Order of the Patriotic War, 1st Degree. He would remain in command of the 162nd into the postwar.

By the start of the Lvov-Sandomierz operation the division had been reassigned to 102nd Rifle Corps, still in 13th Army in the Brody area. The Army had nine reinforced rifle divisions under command and was to use five of them to penetrate the defense on a 4km-wide sector between Zviniache and Krasuv, developing the advance toward Rava-Ruska, defeating the German grouping in that area in the process. A secondary drive that involved the 102nd Corps would move to the southwest and complete the encirclement of Brody in cooperation with right-flank forces of 60th Army. 13th Army was expected to attain a depth of 30-35km by the end of the first day and a further 10-15km on the day following. 1st Guards Tank Army would exploit the gaps created by 13th and 60th Armies.

The operation began on July 13. Overnight, reconnaissance detachments had determined that the German forces holding the forward defensive positions in front of 13th and 3rd Guards Army had begun to withdraw under cover of rearguards. Forward detachments began advancing at 0300 hours, but these were only successful on the right flank of 13th Army, gaining 6-8km before hitting significant resistance. The Front commander, Marshal I. S. Konev, ordered the forward battalions to renew the attack at 0515 on July 14, following a 30-minute artillery preparation. The right-flank forces soon took the main defensive belt and began an aggressive pursuit. Through these two days the 102nd Corps remained on hold along its extended left-flank sector, tying down the German forces it faced. The next afternoon Konev prepared to commit his Baranov Cavalry-Mechanized Group on the morning of July 16 into 13th Army's penetration sector in order to complete the encirclement of Brody. In order to counter this the German command concentrated infantry and armor forces south of Koltuv, launching counterstrikes through the day.

Despite this, the 13th and 3rd Guards moved forward as much as 20-30km during July 17-18. During this time as many as six German divisions, mostly under command of XIII Army Corps, were encircled southwest of Brody. The city was completely occupied on the latter date, and 102nd Corps was given credit for its liberation, while Colonel Muratov would receive the Order of the Red Banner on July 29. The Corps was still fighting to liquidate the encircled grouping on July 20 as 13th Army's main forces were capturing Rava-Ruska. By July 23 the main forces of the Army, following up the successes of 1st Guards Tanks, reached the San River near Kulno, while 102nd Corps was fighting on a line from Kulikuv to Klodno-Vel, north of Lviv.

At about this time the 162nd was moved to 24th Rifle Corps, still in 13th Army. The Army forced the San and captured Przeworsk on July 27. This ended its primary mission, and after fortifying the bridgehead its new mission was to develop the offensive in the general direction of Sandomierz; it was to reach the Vistula River from that place to the confluence of the Visloka River by July 29. Crossing operations were to begin the next day, and 24th Corps' 350th Rifle Division forced the Vistula from the march north of Baranuv. Over the next five days four more divisions entered the bridgehead, including the 162nd. Counterattacks by up to one infantry division backed by 40-50 tanks took place during August 2-3 in an effort to break into the rear of 13th Army, but by now elements of 3rd Guards Tank Army had entered the bridgehead and, after some ground was lost, the German force was held.

German counterattacks continued over the following days, with the transfer of the 23rd and 24th Panzer Divisions, plus several infantry units, in an increasingly desperate effort to eliminate the bridgehead. In response, Konev ordered it reinforced by 5th Guards Army. The intense fighting continued through August 18, when Sandomierz itself was taken. On August 25 the 162nd was transferred to 21st Rifle Corps in 3rd Guards Army. On September 1 the 209th and 224th Rifle Regiments would both be awarded the Order of the Red Banner for crossing the Vistula and the battles for the Sandomierz bridgehead.

==== Redeployment to 2nd Belorussian Front ====
Later that month the division was removed to the Reserve of the Supreme High Command for rebuilding, where it was assigned to the 47th Rifle Corps of 6th Army. It would remain under this Corps command for the duration of the war. In October the 162nd returned to 65th Army, which was still in 1st Belorussian Front, but in the regrouping prior to the winter offensive into Poland and Germany the Army was moved to 2nd Belorussian Front. Finally, in December the 162nd returned to 70th Army, which was now under command of Col. Gen. V. S. Popov. It would remain under these Front and Army commands for the duration.

== Into Poland and Germany ==
Prior to the start of the Vistula-Oder offensive 70th Army had been substantially reinforced and now contained nine rifle divisions organized in three corps. It was located in the Serock bridgehead with the 96th Rifle Corps deployed in a single echelon between Guty and Ciepielin along with one division of 47th Corps; the Corps' remaining two divisions were in second echelon. 114th Rifle Corps was also in second echelon in the area northeast of Serock. The Army's task was to attack on a 3km-wide front in the direction of Nasielsk on the first day, outflank Modlin from the north and then drive west to help prevent the German Warsaw grouping from retreating behind the Vistula. The 114th Corps would remain in reserve in the initial phase. 47th Corps' deeply-echeloned formation on the left flank was intended to facilitate exploitation following the breakthrough of the defense.

2nd Belorussian Front began its offensive on the morning of January 14, 1945. On January 17 the 70th Army made a fighting advance of up to 14km against sagging resistance, forced the Wkra and began fighting for the eastern and southeastern outskirts of Modlin. The 114th Corps was now committed from behind the Army's right flank, although one of its divisions, as well as one from 47th Corps, remained in second echelon. The following day, after stubborn fighting, the Army secured both the town and fortress. The Front's objective was now to reach the mouth of the Vistula and the Baltic coast, thus cutting off the German forces in East Prussia.

During the last week of January the Army seized a bridgehead over the lower Vistula between Fordon and Chełmno and was fighting to widen it while also blockading the German garrison of Toruń. The latter city was understood to contain 3,000 - 4,000 German troops and 47th Corps' 136th Rifle Division plus a regiment of the 71st Rifle Division was considered sufficient to contain it on this sector. In fact it contained 30,000 men and on the night of January 30/31 the garrison attempted to break out to the northwest. The 200th Rifle Division, which was in the Army's second echelon on the western bank of the Vistula about 15–20km west of Kulm, was immediately directed to intercept the escaping grouping and was soon joined by four other rifle divisions plus some of the armor of 1st Guards Tank Corps. During the following week nearly all the forces of 70th Army were involved in containing and eventually eliminating this breakout which was completed on February 8; only small groups succeeded in escaping to the west.

=== East Pomeranian Offensive ===
The next phase of the offensive began on February 10. By this time the 1st Belorussian Front had reached the Oder River and appeared poised to advance on Berlin but the STAVKA was concerned about the potential of German counteroffensive action driving south from Pomerania and ordered the commander of 2nd Belorussian Front, Marshal Rokossovskii, to complete the isolation of East Prussia and eliminate this flank threat. In the subsequent fighting the town of Tuchola was taken on February 15, and in recognition on April 5 the 224th Rifle Regiment would receive the Order of Suvorov, 3rd Degree. On the same date the 22nd Sapper Battalion would be awarded the Order of Bogdan Khmelnitsky, 3rd Degree, for its part in the late February battles for Biały Bór and nearby towns.

After a brief halt and a regrouping 70th Army was ordered to resume the offensive on February 22 in the direction of Konarzyny, Reinwasser and Bartin. Later in the month the main objective of 2nd Belorussian Front was the group of German forces in Gdańsk and Gdynia. On March 23, 70th Army, with the help of flanking forces of other armies, broke through the German defenses and captured the town of Sopot and reached the shore of Gdańsk Bay. 47th Corps had been withdrawn into reserve and gathered in woods south of Bernadowo and Gross Katz. The fighting for Gdańsk ended on March 30 and on May 17 the following decorations were awarded to the division's subunits for the same battle:

- 194th Rifle Regiment - Order of Suvorov, 3rd Degree
- 209th Rifle Regiment - Order of Suvorov, 3rd Degree
- 85th Self-Propelled Artillery Battalion - Order of the Red Star

=== The Berlin Operation ===
70th Army was one of the three combined-arms armies in 2nd Belorussian Front that helped form its shock group at the start of the assault on north-central Germany. At this time the division, in common with most others in the Front, had somewhere between 3,600 and 4,800 personnel on strength. The Army was deployed along a 14km front, but the breakthrough sector was 4km wide along the West Oder River in the area of Mescherin. The 162nd was in the first echelon of 47th Corps with 136th Division, while 71st Division was in second echelon. 3rd Guards Tank Corps was subordinated to 70th Army for the operation. During April 18-19 the Front launched intensive reconnaissance efforts in preparation for the crossings, including the elimination of German advance parties in the lowlands between the East and West Oder. The division designated a reinforced rifle regiment to this task. Over these two days the Army's first echelon took up positions on the east bank of the West Oder, and at one location had managed to create a small bridgehead on the west bank.

The Front's full offensive began on April 20; 70th Army was covered by an hour-long artillery preparation beginning at 0700 hours. This proved inadequate on several sectors, including that of the 162nd in the Greifenhagen area, near the remains of a destroyed bridge. A powerful German strongpoint had been built here, equipped with six machine guns which had not been suppressed. This fire prevented the division from advancing along the dyke on the west bank. The Army continued fighting to cross the West Oder into the night of April 21–22. At 1100 hours on the 22nd it resumed its attack, having beaten off 16 counterattacks, and advanced as much as 2-3km. By the end of the day 47th Corps was fighting along a line from north and east of Schöningen to the eastern outskirts of Pargow to the east edge of Staffelde Creek. The Army made considerable progress the next day, particularly on its left flank, taking the major strongpoint at Harz. By day's end 47th Corps had reached a line from Schöningen to Pargow to Staffelde Creek to Geesow. The Front's bridgehead was now 30km wide and up to 6km deep in 70th Army's zone. The advance continued on April 24, gaining as much as 8km, with Schöningen and several other important positions being taken. 47th Corps reached the line Neu Rossow–Radekow–Keesow following an advance of 7km. On the following day 70th Army beat off eight German attacks, captured Penkun, and advanced 15km, completing the breakthrough of the Oder defensive line; 47th Corps was now on the east bank of the flood plain of the Randow River from Krakow to Radwitz.

70th Army resumed its offensive on the morning of April 26 and forced a crossing of the Randow, the German second defensive zone, along its entire front. It then advanced 6-8km farther. On the following day, with the backing of 3rd Guards Tank Corps, the Army advanced flat-out to the west, covering as much as 30km, and 47th Corps, after taking Prenzlau, ended the day in the area Schönermark–Weggun–Bercholz. Through the period from April 28 to May 5 the further advance was only opposed by small covering detachments seeking in any way to slow down the offensive. On May 3 contact was made with British Second Army east of Wismar and the next day reached the Baltic in the Warnemunde sector, where the 162nd ended the war.

== Postwar ==
The men and women of the division ended the war with the full title 162nd Rifle, Central Asian, Novgorod-Severskii, Order of the Red Banner Division. (Russian: 162-я стрелковая Среднеазиатская Новгород-Северская Краснознамённая дивизия.) In a final round of awards on June 4 it was also decorated with the Order of Suvorov, 2nd Degree, for its part in the fighting for Stettin and other nearby towns. On the same date the following subunits also received awards for the taking of Rostock and other locations:

- 194th Rifle Regiment - Order of Kutuzov, 3rd Degree
- 224th Rifle Regiment - Order of Alexander Nevsky
- 85th Self-Propelled Artillery Battalion - Order of Suvorov, 3rd Degree
- 22nd Sapper Battalion - Order of Alexander Nevsky

According to STAVKA Order No. 11095 of May 29, 1945, part 6, the 165th is listed as one of the rifle divisions to be "disbanded in place". It was disbanded accordingly in July. Colonel Muratov was promoted to the rank of major general on July 11 and on July 29 took command of the 342nd Rifle Division, which he led until September 3.
