= Zinaida Samsonova =

Hero of the Soviet Union (1924–1944)

Zinaida Aleksandrovna Samsonova
- Зинаида Александровна Самсонова
- Born: 14 October 1924; Moscow Governorate, Russian SFSR, Soviet Union
- Died: 27 January 1944 (aged 19); Holma, Gomel Region, Byelorussian SSR, Soviet Union
- Military career
- Allegiance: Soviet Union
- Branch: Medical Service
- Service years: 1942–1944
- Rank: Senior Sergeant
- Unit: 667th Rifle Regiment
- Conflicts: World War II; Eastern Front †; Battle of Stalingrad; Battle of the Dnieper
- Awards: Hero of the Soviet Union

Zinaida Aleksandrovna Samsonova (Russian: Зинаи́да Алекса́ндровна Самсо́нова; 14 October 1924 – 27 January 1944) was a senior medical service sergeant, a combat medic who served in the 667th Infantry Regiment of the 218th Infantry Division of the Soviet 47th Army on the Voronezh Front in World War II. Killed in action on 27 January 1944 by a German sniper while attempting to rescue a wounded Soviet soldier during the Kalinkovichi-Mozyr offensive west of Gomel, she was posthumously awarded the title of Hero of the Soviet Union on 3 June 1944.

== Civilian life ==
Samsonova was born on 14 October 1924 to a Russian family in the Moscow Governate; her father worked as a blacksmith. In the early 1930s the family moved to the town of Kolychevo in Yegoryevsk. After graduating from secondary school in 1939 and completing her training at the Yegoryevsky Medical School in August 1942, Samsonova worked as a nurse in a house for the disabled until 1941 when she was transferred to a construction job after the start of the German invasion of the Soviet Union.

== Military career ==
Samsonova joined the Red Army in October 1942 after completing medical school and leaving her construction job. She was assigned to the 667th Infantry Regiment as part of the medical service. In her career she fought on the Stalingrad and Voronezh Fronts and in the Battles of Stalingrad and Kursk. She was well known among her peers for her bravery after the advance to the Bukrin bridgehead in the Battle of the Dnieper, on 24 September 1943, in which she was one of the first to cross and maintain a bridgehead. In that battle she part of the first landing group, and during the seizure she killed three German soldiers. Between 26–27 September, under heavy enemy fire she evacuated over 30 wounded soldiers to the left bank. In a firefight on September 27 during the night she joined the rest of the troops in a counterattack on German forces, operating an automatic rifle and hand grenades in the battle.

During her career she participated in numerous battles as part of the wider Battle for Dnieper, including battles for Kiev, Zhytomyr, and the Zhitomir–Berdichev Offensive. In November 1943 her unit was transferred from the Voronezh Front to the Belarusian Front.

Her military career was cut short when she was killed by a German sniper on 27 January 1944 while she was evacuating a wounded soldier from the battlefield in the Kalinkovichi-Mozyr offensive. She was buried in a mass grave in Azarychy, Gomel, currently within Belarus, and awarded the title Hero of the Soviet Union on 3 June 1944 by Decree of Supreme Soviet of the USSR.

== Memorials and dedications ==
- A portrait in her likeness was featured on a Soviet postcard in part of a series of postcards featuring female medics that were awarded the title Hero of the Soviet Union.
- Yulia Drunina, one of her colleagues who survived the war and went on to become a celebrity, wrote a poem titled "Zinka" dedicated to Samsonova.
- Various memorial plaques and statues are present throughout the town of Yegoryevsk and the medical school where she studied.
- There are several streets bearing her name in Yegoryevsk, Russia and Azarychy, Belarus.

== See also ==
- List of female Heroes of the Soviet Union
- Zinaida Mareseva
