= Stepan Chernyak =

Stepan Ivanovich Chernyak
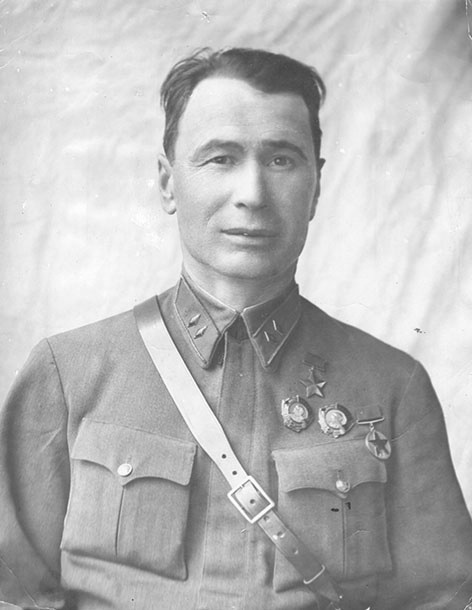
- Chernyak, 1940
- Born: 25 December 1899; Chernevichi, Borisovsky Uyezd, Minsk Governorate, Russian Empire
- Died: 20 July 1976 (aged 76) Krasnodar, Soviet Union
- Allegiance: Russian Empire; Soviet Union
- Branch: Imperial Russian Army; Red Army
- Service years: 1917; 1918–1958
- Rank: General-mayor
- Commands: 136th Rifle Division; 3rd Rifle Corps; 46th Army; 44th Army; 306th Rifle Division; 32nd Rifle Division; 162nd Rifle Division; 41st Rifle Division
- Conflicts: World War I; Russian Civil War; Spanish Civil War; World War II
- Awards: Hero of the Soviet Union

Stepan Ivanovich Chernyak (Russian: Степан Иванович Черняк; 25 December 1899 – 20 July 1976) was a Soviet Army general and Hero of the Soviet Union who held field army and division command during World War II, rising to the rank of general-leytenant.

A veteran of World War I and the Russian Civil War, Chernyak rose through command positions in the interwar Red Army, serving as a military advisor in the Spanish Civil War. Made a Hero of the Soviet Union for his leadership of the 136th Rifle Division during the Winter War, Chernyak commanded the 44th Army in the Battle of the Kerch Peninsula, but after the defeat in Crimea he was demoted and remained a division commander for the rest of the war, which he ended as a general-mayor. His career stagnated postwar and he retired in the late 1950s.

== Early life, World War I and Russian Civil War ==
A Belorussian, Stepan Ivanovich Chernyak was born on 25 December 1899 in the village of Chernevichi, Borisovsky Uyezd, Minsk Governorate. Conscripted into the Imperial Russian Army in January 1917, Chernyak was enlisted as a ryadovoy in a reserve regiment in Voronezh. In May he was sent to the Southwestern Front with a marching company, where he fought as a gunner in the Colt Machine Gun Detachment of the 28th Polotsk Infantry Regiment of the 10th Infantry Division.

During the Russian Civil War, Chernyak joined the Red Guard detachment commanded by Shevchenko in Orsha in November. He became a platoon commander in the detachment. On 13 March 1918 the detachment joined the 10th Minsk Regiment of the Red Army in Minsk and fought in the Grodno sector. In 1919 the regiment was renamed the 72nd Rifle Regiment, and as a platoon commander of the regiment Chernyak fought in battles with Polish troops. On 4 February 1920 he was sent to the 1st Moscow Infantry Command Courses. Graduating from them on 18 February 1921 he was appointed assistant company commander at the Petrograd Red Army Institute. In early March at his request he was sent to the Separate Bashkir Brigade and appointed chief of the machine gun detachment of its 2nd Rifle Regiment. In May with this regiment he took part in the suppression of the anti-Soviet uprising of Georgian Mensheviks in the areas of Tiflis and Batumi, after which the brigade guarded the Black Sea coast.

== Interwar period ==
After the end of the war, the regiment joined the 25th Rifle Regiment of the 9th Don Rifle Division during the reorganization of the army in May 1922. In October Chernyak was sent to study at the 1st Military Railway Command Personnel School in Petrograd, then in the same month transferred to the 8th Petrograd School for Command Personnel. After graduating in September 1924 he was posted to the 111th Rifle Regiment of the 37th Novocherkassk Rifle Division of the Belorussian Military District, where he served as commander of a platoon and rifle and machine gun companies. In January 1930 he was sent to complete the machine gun course of the Vystrel course. On graduation in late March he returned to the regiment and continued serving as a machine gun company commander and rifle battalion commander.

From April 1932 Chernyak served as an instructor at the Training Center for the Preparation of Reserve Command Personnel of the 5th Corps District in Bobruisk. In June 1934 he was transferred to the Moscow Military District to serve as commander of the 26th Separate Territorial Battalion in Michurinsk. From January 1935 he was assistant commander for combat units of the 2nd Rifle Regiment of the 1st Moscow Proletarian Rifle Division, serving as temporary commander of the regiment for four months. In 1936 and 1937 he took part in the Spanish Civil War as an advisor to the 11th Division of the Spanish Republican Army, for which he was awarded the Order of Lenin. Returning to the Soviet Union in September 1938, Chernyak was sent back to the 1st Moscow Rifle Division as its assistant division commander. In August 1939 he was appointed commander of the 136th Rifle Division, which as part of the 13th Army of the Northwestern Front fought in the Winter War. For its breakthrough of the Mannerheim Line the division received the Order of Lenin, and Chernyak was received the title Hero of the Soviet Union on 7 April 1940. From April 1940 he commanded the 3rd Rifle Corps in the Transcaucasus Military District, and received the rank of general-leytenant on 4 June when the Red Army introduced general officer ranks. In November he was sent to complete the Improvement Course for Higher Command Personnel at the Voroshilov Academy of the General Staff, returning to command of the corps on graduation in May 1941.

== World War II ==
After the German invasion of the Soviet Union began, Chernyak's corps defended the Black Sea coast. In late July the 46th Army was formed from the corps, and Chernyak appointed its commander. After finishing its formation, from 23 August, the army covered the Soviet-Turkish border and the Black Sea coast as part of the Transcaucasus Front. Chernyak was appointed commander of the Separate Coastal Army on 13 December, simultaneously serving as assistant commander of the Black Sea Fleet for infantry. Under his command, the army took part in the defense of Sevastopol. Chernyak was transferred to command the 44th Army of the Crimean Front on 8 February 1942, taking command as it fought in the Battle of the Kerch Peninsula. After the defeat of the Soviet troops on the peninsula the remnants of the army were evacuated to the Taman Peninsula. For the defeat in Crimea, Chernyak was relieved of command by a Stavka directive on 29 May 1942, and in early June demoted to colonel.

Chernyak commanded the 306th Rifle Division of the 10th Reserve Army in the Stavka reserve from 15 June. The division was sent to the Kalinin Front in October, where it defended a line northeast of Demidov. On 12 December 1942 Chernyak was shell-shocked in battle and hospitalized. After recovering in April 1943 he was appointed deputy commander of the 5th Guards Rifle Corps, which as part of the 39th Army fought in the Rzhev-Vyazma, Dukhovshchina-Demidov, and Smolensk offensives, in the liberation of Verdino, Dukhovshchina, Rudnya and others. From June he commanded the 32nd Rifle Division of the front's 3rd Shock Army. On 23 August, for “failure to carry out the orders for the breakthrough of the German defensive line,” front commander Andrey Yeryomenko relieved Chernyak of command. He remained at the disposal of the Main Cadre Directorate awaiting assignment until October, when he was sent to the Belorussian Front.

Chernyak took command of the 162nd Rifle Division of the front's 65th Army on 30 October, which he led in the Gomel–Rechitsa offensive. For successful operations in the liberation of Rechitsa the division was awarded the Order of the Red Banner. In January 1944 during the Kalinkovichi–Mozyr offensive Chernyak was wounded and until March recovered in a hospital, then was appointed commander of the 41st Rifle Division. Until July 1944 as part of the 1st Belorussian Front the division fought in defensive battles on the right bank of the Turya river in Kovel Oblast, then as part of the 69th Army of the front took part in the Lublin-Brest, Warsaw-Poznan, and Berlin offensives, forcing the Vistula and Oder rivers. In August for the breakthrough of German defenses west of Kovel the division received the Order of the Red Banner, and then-Major General Chernyak the Order of Suvorov 2nd class. In May 1945 for the breakthrough of the German defenses on the Oder and for successful fulfillment of objectives in the Berlin offensive he was awarded the Order of Kutuzov 2nd class.

== Postwar ==
After the end of the war, Chernyak after the disbandment of the division in June and July was placed at the disposal of the Group of Soviet Occupation Forces in Germany Military Council, and then was appointed chief of the group's Combat and Political Training Directorate. From August 1947 he served as military commissar of Kalinin Oblast, and transferred to hold the same position in Krasnodar Krai in January 1954. Chernyak was transferred to the reserve in April 1958, and died on 20 July 1976 in Krasnodar.

== Decorations ==
Chernyak was a recipient of the following decorations:

- Order of Lenin (3)
- Order of the Red Banner (3)
- Order of Suvorov, 2nd class (2)
- Order of Kutuzov, 2nd class
- Order of the Cross of Grunwald, 3rd class (Polish People's Republic)
- Cross of Valour (Polish People's Republic)
