= 306th Division =

306th Division may refer to:

- 306th Infantry Division, Wehrmacht, Germany
- 306th Rifle Division, Soviet Union

== See also ==
- List of military divisions by number
