= Yulia Drunina =

Soviet poet, nurse and combat medic

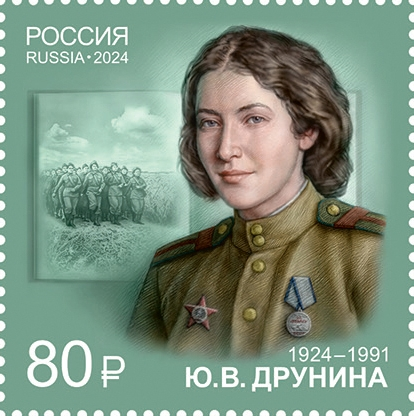
- Drunina on a 2024 stamp of Russia
- Born: 10 May 1924; Moscow, RSFSR, USSR
- Died: 20 November 1991 (aged 67); Moscow, RSFSR, USSR
- Occupation: Poet
- Relatives: Vladimir Pavlovich Drunin and Mathilde Borisovna Drunina
- Writing career
- Language: Russian
- Period: 1945–1991
- Genre: Verse (poetry)

Signature
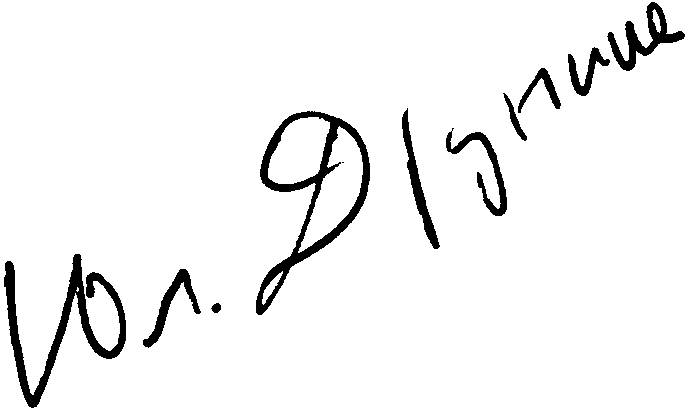

Yulia Vladimirovna Drunina (Russian: Ю́лия Влади́мировна Дру́нина, IPA: [ˈjʉlʲɪjə vlɐˈdʲimʲɪrəvnə ˈdrunʲɪnə]; 10 May 1924 – 20 November 1991) was a Soviet poet who wrote in the Russian language. She was a nurse and a combat medic during World War II and known for writing lyrics and poetry about women at war. Her works are characterized by moral clarity, sincere intonation and based on her real life experience, including participation in the war as a source of inspiration for her writings.

== Biography ==
Yulia grew up in Moscow. Her father was a history teacher and her mother worked in a library and gave music lessons. Julia started writing poetry when she was 11 and in the late 1930s one of her poems won a contest and was published in a newspaper.

After the USSR was attacked by Germany in June 1941, 17-year-old Julia joined the Red Cross, trained as a nurse and began volunteering at a local hospital. Later that summer, as the German army approached Moscow, she was dispatched to help build fortifications near Mozhaisk, about 100 km to the West of the capital. There, during an air strike, she got separated from her party and was picked up by a group infantrymen, who needed a combat medic. The group later found itself encircled by the enemy and spent 13 days breaking out through occupied territory. During those 13 days, Yulia fell in love with the battalion commander and described him in several poems written throughout her life, by referring to him simply as "Commander". The commander, along with several other infantrymen from the group, did not make it out of the encirclement, having been killed by a landmine explosion.

Yulia returned to Moscow in the fall of 1941 but soon left for Siberia, together with her father, as part of the civilian evacuation. She did not want to leave Moscow and agreed to evacuate only because of her ailing father, who had suffered a stroke at the beginning of the War. After her father died in early 1942, Yulia went to Khabarovsk, in the Russian Far East, where she enrolled in a school for aviation technicians but, wanting to fight on the frontlines, she soon joined a rifle unit as a combat medic and was sent to the Belorussian Front, where she served alongside Zinaida Samsonova (also a combat medic), who in 1944 died in combat and was posthumously awarded the title of the Hero of the Soviet Union. Drunina later wrote one of her most heartfelt poems, "Zinka", about Samsonova.

In 1943 Drunina was seriously injured when a shell fragment struck her in the neck several millimeters from her carotid artery. Unaware of the severity of her injury, she simply wrapped her neck in bandages and continued to work. Eventually, she was hospitalized in critical condition and was said to have barely survived. She wrote her first poems about the War while in the hospital. After recovering, she returned to Moscow where she applied to the Maxim Gorky Literature Institute but was denied admission, her writing having been deemed not mature enough. She then returned to the front and fought near Pskov and in the Baltic region. She was wounded again in November 1944 and spent the rest of the War in Moscow where she again tried her luck at the Literature Institute and this time was allowed to enroll as a war veteran.

She married her classmate and fellow war veteran Nikolai Starshinov in 1944 and gave birth to her only daughter, Elena, in 1946. The family lived in a communal apartment in extreme poverty in post-war Moscow, while Julia continued to write. Several of her poems were published in the 1940s, including her first book in 1948, followed by several more in the subsequent decades. She also wrote a short story, "Aliska" and an autobiographical novel, "From Three Peaks".

In 1960, she divorced her first husband and married screenwriter Alexei Kapler, whom she had met in 1954. Drunina and Kapler remained happily married until Kapler's death in 1979. Drunina devoted many poems to her husband.

During the perestroika era, she was elected to the Supreme Soviet of the USSR. During the August Coup, 1991, she was one of the many intellectuals to take part in defending the "White House". However, she was terribly depressed later by dissolution of the Soviet Union and publications critical of the Soviet system. She committed suicide on 21 November 1991.

She was buried next to her husband, Alexei Kapler at the Stary Krym cemetery in Stary Krym.

A minor planet 3804 Drunina, discovered by Soviet astronomer Lyudmila Chernykh in 1969 is named after her.
