= Azarychy, Gomel region =

Azarychy Азарычы (Belarusian) Озаричи (Russian)
- Urban-type settlement
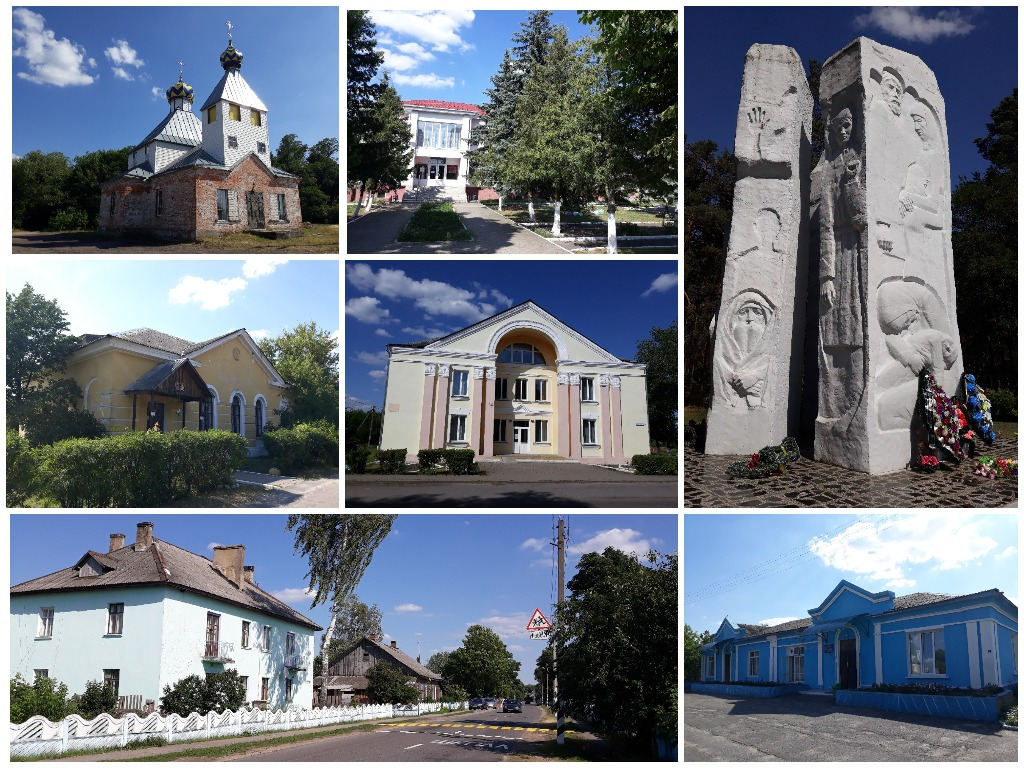

- Flag Seal

- Location within Belarus Location within Europe
- Coordinates: 52.4636°N 29.2672°E
- Country: Belarus
- Region: Gomel Region
- District: Kalinkavichy District

Population (2025)
  - Total: 1,222
- Time zone: UTC+3 (MSK)

Azarychy (Belarusian: Аза́рычы, romanized: Azaryčy; Russian: Оза́ричи, romanized: Ozarichi; Polish: Azarycze; Yiddish: אַזאַריטש) is an urban-type settlement in Kalinkavichy District, Gomel Region, Belarus. As of 2025, it has a population of 1,222. The village had a large Jewish community.

== History ==
According to the 1939 census, 47% of the total population was Jewish. The Germans occupied the town from November 1941 to January 1944 and built three camps. Between 9,000 and 13,000 of the up to 50,000 imprisoned Belarusian and Russian men, women and children did not survive their incarceration at the camps.
