= Male Vesele =

Village in Kharkiv Oblast, Ukraine

Male Vesele Мале Веселе
- Interactive map of Male Vesele
- Male Vesele in Kharkiv Oblast Male Vesele (Ukraine)
- Coordinates: 50.145278°N 36.545°E
- Country: Ukraine
- Oblast: Kharkiv Oblast
- Raion: Kharkiv Raion
- Established: 1930

Area
  - Total: 0.4 km^{2} (0.15 sq mi)
- Elevation: 206 m (676 ft)

Population (2001 census)
  - Total: 176
  - Density: 440/km^{2} (1,100/sq mi)
- Time zone: UTC+2 (EET)
  - Summer (DST): UTC+3 (EEST)
- Postal code: 62420
- Area code: +380 57

Male Vesele (Ukrainian: Мале Веселе; Russian: Малое Весёлое); until 2016 Radhospne (Радгоспне)) is a rural settlement in Kharkiv Raion (district) in Kharkiv Oblast of eastern Ukraine, at about 29.2 kilometres (18.1 mi) north-east from the centre of Kharkiv city.

The settlement came under attack by Russian forces during the Russian invasion of Ukraine in 2022.
