= Kalinkavichy =

Kalinkavichy Калінкавічы (Belarusian) Калинковичи (Russian)
- Town
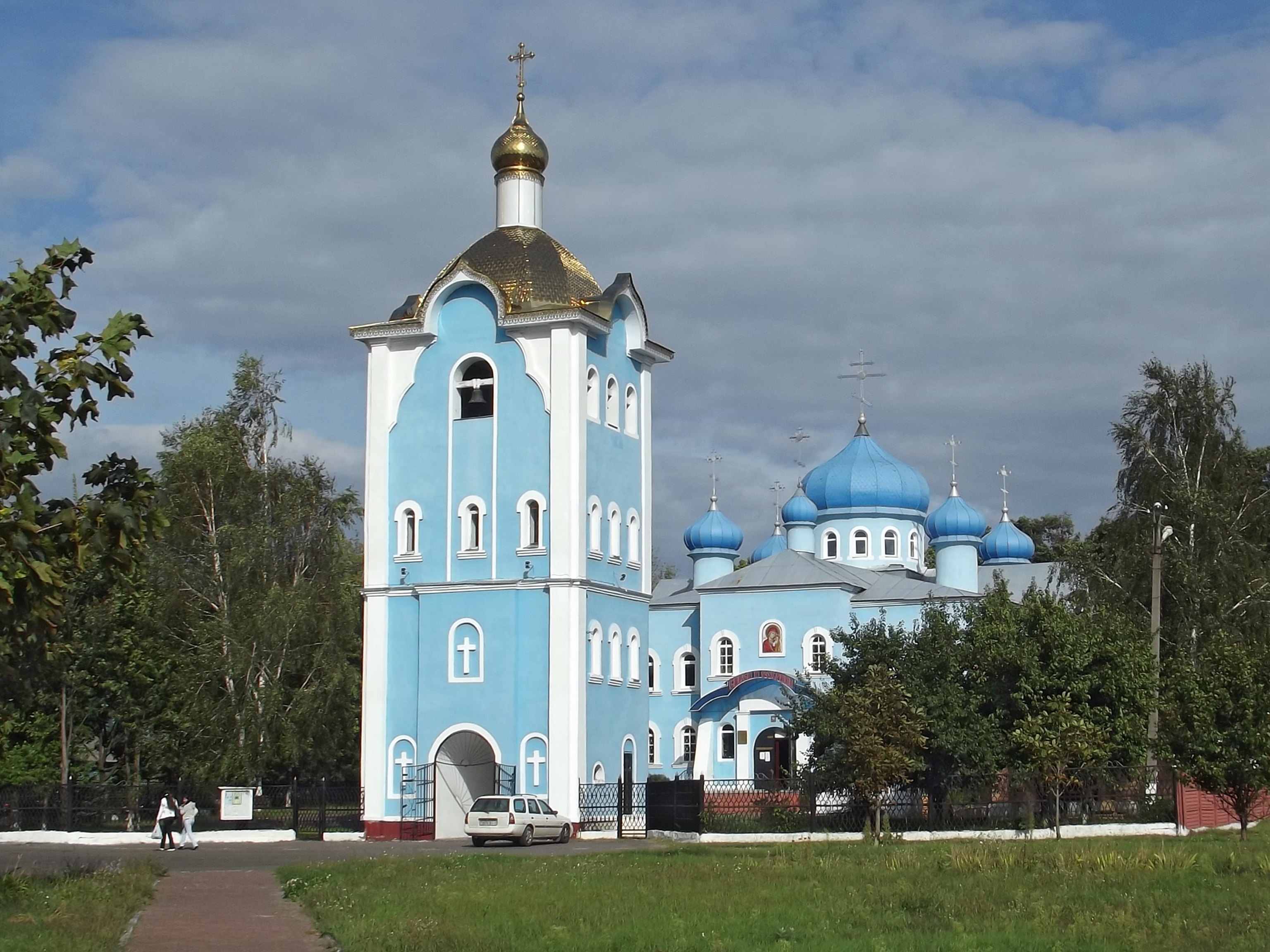
- Kazan church

- Flag Coat of arms

- Location within Belarus
- Coordinates: 52°07′30″N 29°20′00″E
- Country: Belarus
- Region: Gomel Region
- District: Kalinkavichy District
- First mentioned: 1560
- Elevation: 172 m (564 ft)

Population (2025)
  - Total: 36,656
- Time zone: UTC+3 (MSK)
- Postal codes: 247691-247695, 247710
- Area code: +375 2345
- License plate: 3
- Website: Official website (in Russian)

Kalinkavichy (Belarusian: Калінкавічы; Russian: Калинковичи, romanized: Kalinkovichi; Polish: Kalinkowicze) is a town in Gomel Region, southeastern Belarus. It serves as the administrative center of Kalinkavichy District. Kalinkavichy is located beside the Netech' River, opposite the city of Mazyr, and is the site of one of the country's most important railway junctions. In 2004, its population was 37,876. As of 2025, it has a population of 36,656.

== History ==
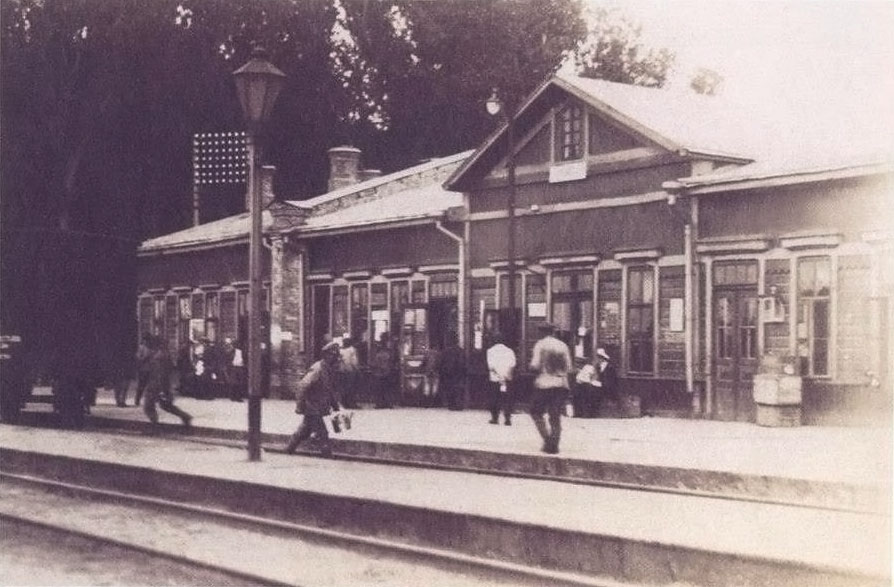
Railway station in 1918

Archaeological excavations have found traces of human settlement dating back to 26,000-24,000 years ago near Yurovičy, the oldest yet discovered in Belarus.

The earliest historical mention of the town of Kalinkavičy dates to 1560. The town grew to prominence at the end of the nineteenth century with the coming of the railways.

Before World War II, a significant part of the population was Jewish, 3,386 out of 9,799 were Jews. Kalinkavichy was under German occupation from 22 August 1941 until 14 January 1944. Before the arrival of the German forces, a part of the Jewish population managed to evacuate the city by train. On September 20, 1941, all the Jews were shot by collaborating policemen and German gendarmes in a trench.

Food processing (esp. pork products) is the largest industry. The extraction of peat (5.5 million tonnes of reserves) is also economically important.

== Overview ==
The mean January temperature is 6.2 °C (43 °F); July 18.7 °C (66 °F). Precipitation totals 575 mm (22.64 in) per annum.

Kalinkavičy is also known for the annual Avtyuki comedy festival, held every June.

In 1998, the town was united with the surrounding rural area to form a single administrative unit, Kalinkavičy Rajon, covering 2,756 km^{2} (1,064.10 sq mi), with a total population of 71,500.

== Notable people ==
- One of the most notable figures born in Kalinkavicy was Solomon Simon (1895–1970), a well-known Yiddish author who emigrated to New York City in 1913. His autobiography, "My Jewish Roots," describes his early childhood years in Kalinkavichy (Kalinkovich).
- Katherine Locke, a stage and supporting screen actress of the 1930s and 40s was born in Kalinkavichy, prior to emigrating to the United States.
- IDF General Yehoshua Globerman (1905-1947)
- Igor Fruman was born in Kalinkavichy, and immigrated to the U.S., later working in Ukraine for a time.
