= Kalinkavichy district =

District of Gomel region, Belarus

Coordinates: 52°08′N 29°20′E

Kalinkavichy district Калінкавіцкі раён (Belarusian) Калинковичский район (Russian)
- District
- Flag Coat of arms

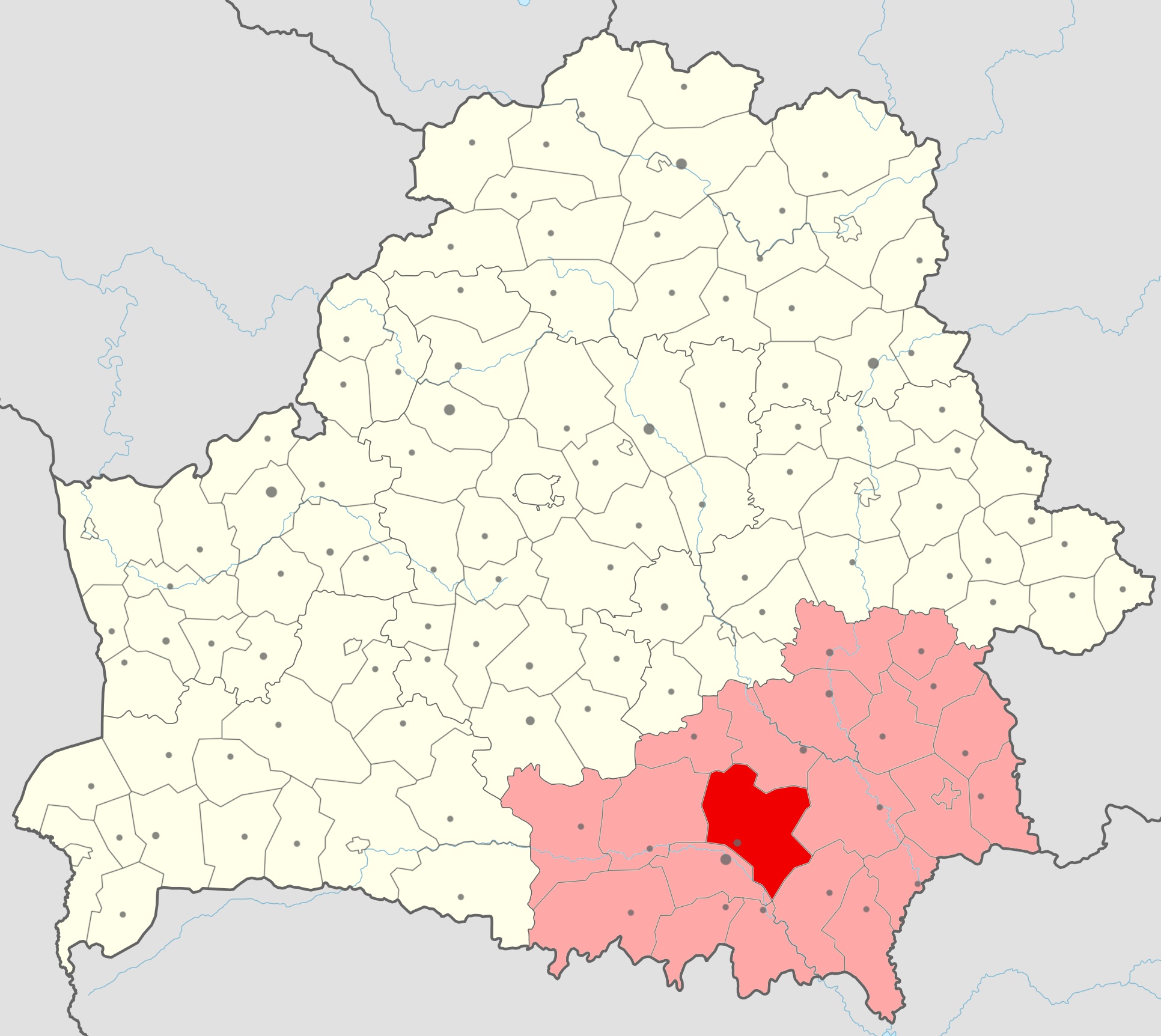
- Country: Belarus
- Region: Gomel region
- Administrative center: Kalinkavichy

Area
  - Total: 2,756.24 km^{2} (1,064.19 sq mi)

Population (2024)
  - Total: 54,661
  - Density: 19.832/km^{2} (51.364/sq mi)
- Time zone: UTC+3 (MSK)

Kalinkavichy district or Kalinkavičy district (Belarusian: Калінкавіцкі раён, romanized: Kalinkavicki rajon; Russian: Калинковичский район) is a district (raion) of Gomel region in Belarus. Its administrative center is Kalinkavichy. As of 2024, it has a population of 54,661.

In 1998, the rural area was united with the town of Kalinkavichy to form a single administrative unit covering 2,756 square kilometres (1,064 sq mi), with a total population of 71,500.
