= 136th Rifle Division =

- Active: 1939–1945
- Country: Soviet Union
- Allegiance: Red Army
- Branch: Infantry
- Size: Division

The 136th Rifle Division was a division in the Red Army during World War II. It was formed three times.

== 1st Formation ==
1939 – February 1942: On 22 June 1941 it was part of the 23rd Rifle Corps of the Transcaucasian Military District. Redesignated 15th Guards Rifle Division in 1942.

== 2nd Formation ==
- February 1942 – January 1943: Formed from the 8th Rifle Brigade. Redesignated 63rd Guards Rifle Division on January 19, 1943.

== 3rd Formation ==
February 1943 – May 1945: Formed February 1943. The division disbanded in summer 1945 as part of the Group of Soviet Forces in Germany.
