= 306th Rifle Division =

306th Rifle Division (September 1941 – ?) 306th Rifle Division (June 16, 1942 – 1945)
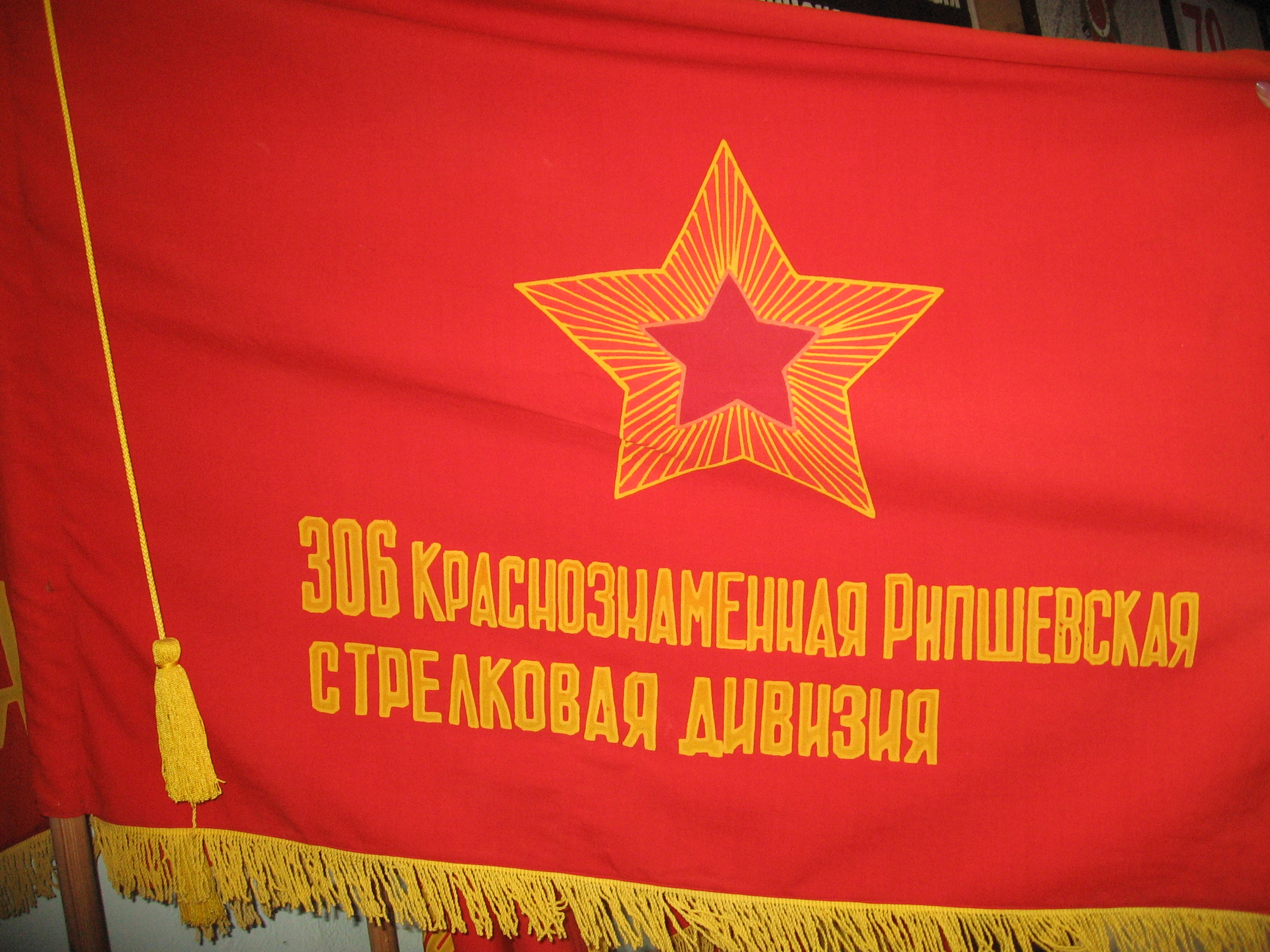
- A copy of the division's banner in a museum in Dukhovshchina
- Active: 1941–1945
- Country: Soviet Union
- Branch: Red Army
- Type: Infantry
- Size: Division
- Engagements: Battle of Smolensk; Vitebsk-Orsha Offensive; Šiauliai Offensive; Riga Offensive; Courland Pocket
- Decorations: Order of the Red Banner
- Battle honours: Ribshevo

Commanders
- Notable commanders: Col. Stepan Ivanovich Chernyak; Col. Georgii Matveevich Kostik; Col. Vasilii Tikhonovich Gnedin; Maj. Gen. Mikhail Ivanovich Kucheryavenko

The 306th Rifle Division began its combat path under unusual circumstances. It was partly formed for the first time as a standard Red Army rifle division a few months after the German invasion, but the formation process appears to have been abandoned and the unit was never assigned to the front. A second formation began in April 1942 and was completed on June 16, after which it was sent to the Kalinin Front. Assigned to 43rd Army, it remained in that Army until November 1944, and in that Front (renamed 1st Baltic Front) until March 1945. It ended the war in Leningrad Front, helping to contain the German forces trapped in the Courland Pocket. The division had compiled a solid record of service and won a unique battle honor by this time, and was disbanded shortly after hostilities ended.

== 1st Formation ==
The 306th Rifle Division began forming in September 1941 in the Moscow Military District. Very little is known about this formation:

"Twenty other divisions were formed in September 1941 in various locations (table 5.21). Very few data have been found on the last seven divisions [including the 306th] formed in September. These divisions were never assigned to a frontline unit. They may have been used on the Turkish border, in Iran, or in the Far East."

== 2nd Formation ==
The second 306th Rifle Division began forming in April 1942 in the Moscow Military District, and had its first commander, Lt. Col. Andrei Grigorevich Frolenkov, assigned on June 16. The division's order of battle was as follows:

- 935th Rifle Regiment
- 938th Rifle Regiment
- 992nd Rifle Regiment
- 1043rd Artillery Regiment
- 429th Antitank Battalion
- 342nd Sapper Battalion
- 915th Signal Battalion
- 210th Reconnaissance Company

The division spent an unusually long time in the process of forming up. At the end of June it was assigned to 10th Reserve Army, and Col. Stepan Ivanovich Chernyak took command on July 8, a post he would hold until January 12, 1943. Instead of being shipped south along with the rest of what became the 5th Shock Army, it was moved in August to join 43rd Army, still in the Reserve of the Supreme High Command. In September, that Army was assigned to Kalinin Front. The 306th remained in that Army and Front for an unusually long time. During October 1942 the division, along with several others of its Army, was on notice to prepare to join in the planned second stage of Operation Mars; in the event this did not take place because the first stage was unsuccessful. Following two previous changes in command (including one brief stint by Col. Mikhail Ivanovich Kucheryavenko in March 1943) the divisional command passed to Col. Georgii Matveevich Kostik on March 27, 1943, and he would remain in this position until April 19, 1944. In September 1943, the 306th was assigned to the 91st Rifle Corps.

=== Smolensk and Vitebsk Offensives ===
In that same month the division was participating in the offensive to liberate Smolensk. On September 13 the 306th, and its corps-mate, the 179th Rifle Division, attacked the left flank of the German 256th Infantry Division and made a small breakthrough at Bedenki. This was countered by the few local reserves available. The next day the 306th liberated the fortified village of Ribshevo. In recognition of this success, on September 15 the division was uniquely granted that name as an honorific:

"RIBSHEVO – ...306th Rifle Division (Colonel Kucheryavenko, Mikhail Ivanovich)... By order of the Supreme High Command of 19 September 1943 and a commendation in Moscow, the troops who participated in the battles for the liberation of Ribshevo are given a salute of 12 artillery salvoes from 124 guns."

In early November, 43rd and 39th Armies were ordered to concentrate north of the Smolensk – Vitebsk railroad and highway in preparation for a new offensive against the latter city to begin on the 8th. 91st Corps was in first echelon on the right side of its Army's attack frontage. The two armies had about a five-fold superiority in infantry, in spite of their rifle divisions (including the 306th) being at about half their authorized strength. The assault made good initial progress; 43rd Army hit the junction of German 14th and 206th Infantry Divisions of VI Army Corps south of Ianovichi, about 24 km due east of Vitebsk, and tore a gaping hole through their defenses. On the following day the combined assault of both armies had produced a 10 km-wide breach, and by evening the lead elements of the attackers had reached Poddube, just 10 km from the inner defense lines of Vitebsk proper, and the defensive fronts of both German divisions were in shambles. However, enemy reserves managed to contain 43rd Army's advance at this point on November 11, and by the 17th the Soviet assault had expired in exhaustion.

A further effort towards Vitebsk began on December 19. In this assault, the 306th was in second echelon of its Corps, behind 179th and 270th Rifle Divisions. By the end of the day the enemy had been driven back up to 3 km on an 8 km front, and the next day the division was committed into this breach, and made a further advance of up to 2 km in heavy fighting, but German reserves again intervened, and although the Soviet forces managed to reach the road between Vitebsk and Surazh on a 10 km sector before December 23, the offensive had to be once again shut down. Yet another assault began on that date. In this, 91st Corps acted in a supporting role to 39th and 33rd Armies by once again attacking the 14th Infantry's positions. The 306th was in the first echelon alongside the 270th in a sector between Kovalie and Piatiletna, backed by the 179th, the remaining vehicles of two tank brigades, and a motorized infantry brigade. The attack penetrated to within 2 km south of the Vitebsk-Surazh road, and along with advances on other sectors forced the German LIII Army Corps to withdraw to new defenses even closer to Vitebsk.

=== Operation Bagration ===
In February 1944, the division was reassigned to 1st Rifle Corps, and it was in this Corps at the start of Operation Bagration. Following a very heavy artillery barrage lasting 20 minutes at dawn on June 22, assault companies of the division, in concert with those of six other divisions, attacked the positions of the German 252nd Infantry Division and Corps Detachment D on a 20 km front, breaking through to the second defense line by noon. By evening an armored group supported by the 306th and two other rifle divisions had crossed the Obol River and were pushing southwest towards the Vitebsk – Polotsk rail line, having advanced 7 km during the day. The following day the division assisted in the envelopment of Corps Detachment D's positions in Shumilino and forced a crossing of the Dvina River by evening. From here, 1st Rifle Corps was ordered westward, and reached Beshenkovichi by the end of June 25. By the 27th it had reached Lepel, against scattered German resistance.

Along with its Army, in the following months the 306th advanced into the "Baltic Gap" between Army Groups North and Center, driving towards Riga and the Baltic coast and trapping the remains of Army Group North in the Courland Pocket. In November it was moved, with its Corps, briefly into 2nd Guards Army, then to the 4th Shock Army, then again to the 51st Army. 51st Army was reassigned to the 2nd Baltic Front in February 1945, but in March and for the duration the division was in the 1st Shock Army of the Courland Group. The men and women of the 306th Rifle Division ended the war with the official title of 306th Rifle, Ribshevo, Order of the Red Banner Division. (Russian: 306-я стрелковая Рибшевская Краснознамённая дивизия.)

== Postwar ==
The army moved to Turkestan with the 1st Rifle Corps. It was stationed at Samarkand and disbanded around 30 October 1945, when the corps included a different rifle division and a rifle brigade instead of the 306th Division.
