= Burg (Amt) =

Burg (Spreewald)
- Amt
- Map of Spree-Neiße highlighting Burg (Spreewald)
- Interactive map of Burg (Spreewald)
- Location within Germany Location within Brandenburg
- Coordinates: 51°50′N 14°09′E
- Country: Germany
- State: Brandenburg
- District: Spree-Neiße
- Seat: Burg (Spreewald)
- Subdivisions: 6 municipalities

Area
  - Total: 126.46 km^{2} (48.83 sq mi)

Population (2025-12-31)
  - Total: 8,904
  - Density: 70.41/km^{2} (182.4/sq mi)
- Time zone: UTC+01:00 (CET)
  - Summer (DST): UTC+02:00 (CEST)
- Website: www.amt-burg-spreewald.de

Amt Burg (Spreewald) is an Amt ("collective municipality") in the district of Spree-Neiße, in Brandenburg, Germany. Its seat is in Burg (Spreewald).

The Amt Burg (Spreewald) consists of the following municipalities:

1. Briesen
2. Burg
3. Dissen-Striesow
4. Guhrow
5. Schmogrow-Fehrow
6. Werben

== Demography ==
Development of population since 1875 within the current Boundaries (Blue Line: Population; Dotted Line: Comparison to Population development in Brandenburg state; Grey Background: Time of Nazi Germany; Red Background: Time of communist East Germany)

Recent Population Development and Projections (Population Development before Census 2011 (blue line); Recent Population Development according to the Census in Germany in 2011 (blue bordered line); Official projections for 2005-2030 (yellow line); for 2017-2030 (scarlet line); for 2020-2030 (green line)

Amt Burg (Spreewald): Population development
within the current boundaries (2020)

Year	Pop.	±% p.a.
1875	10,150	—
1890	9,961	−0.13%
1910	9,662	−0.15%
1925	9,355	−0.22%
1939	9,282	−0.06%
1950	11,266	+1.78%
1964	9,246	−1.40%
1971	8,978	−0.42%
1981	8,302	−0.78%

Year	Pop.	±% p.a.
1985	8,091	−0.64%
1990	7,982	−0.27%
1995	8,433	+1.11%
2000	9,957	+3.38%
2005	9,934	−0.05%
2010	9,423	−1.05%
2015	9,141	−0.61%
2020	9,059	−0.18%
2025	8,904	−0.34%
