= Kathlow =

Kathlow Kótłow
- Village of Neuhausen/Spree
- Interactive map of Kathlow
- Location within Germany Location within Brandenburg
- Coordinates: 51°44′N 14°29′E
- Country: Germany
- State: Brandenburg
- District: Spree-Neiße
- Municipality: Neuhausen/Spree

Population
  - Total: 138
- Time zone: UTC+01:00 (CET)
  - Summer (DST): UTC+02:00 (CEST)

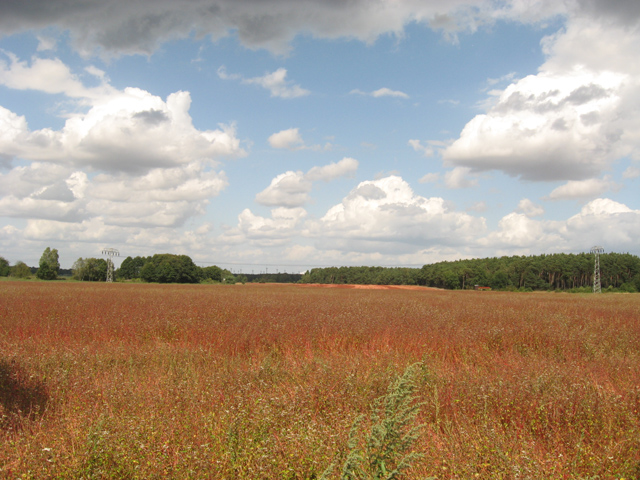
Agricultural fields near the village of Kathlow in Brandenburg, Germany.

Kathlow (Sorbian:Kótłow) is a small village in Neuhausen/Spree municipality in the district of Spree-Neiße in Brandenburg state, Germany. The population as of 31 December 2012 was 138.

== Location ==
Latitude: 51° 43' 0" N
Longitude: 14° 28' 60" E
20.6 km west of Forst

== History ==
From 1815 to 1947, Kathlow was part of the Prussian Province of Brandenburg.

After World War II, Kathlow was incorporated into the State of Brandenburg from 1947 to 1952 and the Bezirk Cottbus of East Germany from 1952 to 1990. Since 1990, Kathlow has been part of Brandenburg and since 19 September 2004, it has been part of Neuhausen/Spree.

== Population history ==
271 (1875) 243 (1890) 232 (1910) 277 (1925) 250 (1933) 276 (1946) 161 (1993) 164 (1994) 162 (1995) 162 (1996) 181 (1997) 176 (1998) 182 (1999) 182 (2000) 176 (2001) 169 (2002) 169 (2003) 184 (2006)

Unlike most rural settlements in the former East Germany, the population of Kathlow after the reunification of East Germany and West Germany in 1990 has been at times growing and at times declining.
