= Oberspreewald-Lausitz II/Spree-Neiße IV =

State electoral district of Germany

39: Oberspreewald-Lausitz II/Spree-Neiße IV
- Electoral district for the Landtag of Brandenburg
- Oberspreewald-Lausitz II/Spree-Neiße IV in 2024
- District: Oberspreewald-Lausitz and Spree-Neiße
- Electorate: 35,461 (2024)
- Major settlements: Großräschen, Senftenberg, and Drebkau

Current electoral district
- Created: 1994
- Party: AfD
- Member: Fabian Jank

Oberspreewald-Lausitz II/Spree-Neiße IV is an electoral constituency (German: Wahlkreis) represented in the Landtag of Brandenburg. It elects one member via first-past-the-post voting. Under the constituency numbering system, it is designated as constituency 39. It is split between the districts of Oberspreewald-Lausitz and Spree-Neiße.

== Geography ==
The constituency includes the towns of Großräschen and Senftenberg and the district of Altdöbern within Oberspreewald-Lausitz, and the town of Drebkau within Spree-Neiße.

There were 35,461 eligible voters in 2024.

== Members ==
Election	Member	Party	%
2004	Gerd-Rüdiger Hoffmann	PDS	35.6
2009	Gerd-Rüdiger Hoffmann	Left	33.8
2014	Wolfgang Roick	SPD	40.4
2019	Wolfgang Roick	SPD	30.3
2024	Fabian Jank	AfD	38.7

== Election results ==
=== 2024 election ===
State election (2024): Oberspreewald-Lausitz II/Spree-Neiße IV
Notes:	Blue background denotes the winner of the electorate vote. Pink background denotes a candidate elected from their party list. Yellow background denotes an electorate win by a list member, or other incumbent. A ✓ or ✗ denotes status of any incumbent, win or lose respectively.						
Party	Candidate	Votes	%	±%	Party votes	%	±%
AfD	Fabian Jank	9,439	38.7	▲9.6	8,829	36.0	▲6.7
SPD	✗ Wolfgang Roick	8,597	35.3	▲5.0	7,411	30.2	▲1.6
BSW					3,565	14.6	
CDU	Strohschneider	3,278	13.4	▲0.3	2,425	9.9	▼4.6
Left	Bauer	1,090	4.5	▼6.8	604	2.4	▼8.1
BVB/FW	Geike	920	3.8	▼2.9	408	1.7	▼3.1
APT	Zibi	639	2.6		429	1.8	▼0.6
FDP	Sauer	223	0.9	▼2.3	154	0.6	▼3.1
Greens	Hiekel	197	0.8	▼3.4	344	1.4	▼3.3
Plus					133	0.5	▼0.5
DLW					93	0.4	
Values					56	0.2	
Third Way					33	0.1	
DKP					16	0.1	
Informal votes		361			244		
Total valid votes		24,383			24,500		
Turnout		24,744	69.8	▲11.8			
AfD gain from SPD	Majority	842	3.4				

=== 2019 election ===
State election (2019): Oberspreewald-Lausitz II/Spree-Neiße IV
Notes:	Blue background denotes the winner of the electorate vote. Pink background denotes a candidate elected from their party list. Yellow background denotes an electorate win by a list member, or other incumbent. A ✓ or ✗ denotes status of any incumbent, win or lose respectively.						
Party	Candidate	Votes	%	±%	Party votes	%	±%
SPD	✓ Wolfgang Roick	6,441	30.3	▼11.4	6,100	28.6	▼11.8
AfD	Matthias Stein	6,191	29.1		6,247	29.3	▲18.5
CDU	Julian Brüning	2,801	13.2	▼10.3	3,079	14.5	▼6.9
Left	Torsten Richter	2,406	11.3	▼9.9	2,254	10.6	▼6.6
BVB/FW	Ilona Nicklisch	1,421	6.7	▼3.5	1,021	4.8	▲2.2
Greens	Daniel Schnarr	893	4.2	▲0.8	994	4.7	▲1.8
FDP	Holger Stroisch	694	3.3		796	3.7	▲3.0
Tierschutzpartei					508	2.4	
Die PARTEI	Bianca Schröder	428	2.0				
Pirates					153	0.7	▼0.4
V-Partei3					77	0.4	
ÖDP					74	0.3	
Informal votes		328			300		
Total valid votes		21,275			21,303		
Turnout		21,603	58.0	▲8.7			
SPD hold	Majority	250	1.2	▼18.2			

=== 2014 election ===
State election (2014): Oberspreewald-Lausitz II/Spree-Neiße IV
Notes:	Blue background denotes the winner of the electorate vote. Pink background denotes a candidate elected from their party list. Yellow background denotes an electorate win by a list member, or other incumbent. A ✓ or ✗ denotes status of any incumbent, win or lose respectively.						
Party	Candidate	Votes	%	±%	Party votes	%	±%
SPD	Wolfgang Roick	7,820	41.7	▲9.9	7,735	40.4	▲7.3
CDU	Marcel Templin	4,417	23.5	▲1.9	4,101	21.4	▲1.9
Left	Ringo Jünigk	3,988	21.2	▼12.6	3,282	17.2	▼11.7
AfD					2,073	10.8	
BVB/FW	Ilona Nicklisch	1,919	10.2	▲6.3	496	2.6	▼0.2
Greens	Winfried Böhmer	631	3.4	▲0.2	548	2.9	▼0.3
NPD					455	2.4	▼0.2
Pirates					210	1.1	
FDP					143	0.7	▼5.5
REP					56	0.3	▲0.1
DKP					29	0.2	▲0.1
Informal votes		731			378		
Total valid votes		18,775			19,128		
Turnout		19,506	49.3	▼14.1			
SPD gain from Left	Majority	3,403	18.2				

=== 2009 election ===
State election (2009): Oberspreewald-Lausitz II/Spree-Neiße IV
Notes:	Blue background denotes the winner of the electorate vote. Pink background denotes a candidate elected from their party list. Yellow background denotes an electorate win by a list member, or other incumbent. A ✓ or ✗ denotes status of any incumbent, win or lose respectively.						
Party	Candidate	Votes	%	±%	Party votes	%	±%
Left	Gerd-Rüdiger Hoffmann	8,730	33.8	▼1.8	7,557	28.9	▼0.2
SPD	Martina Gregor-Ness	8,229	31.8	▲4.1	8,661	33.1	▲4.3
CDU	Frank Losch	5,592	21.6	▼0.9	5,095	19.5	▲0.5
FDP	Steven Eulitz	1,450	5.6	▲1.0	1,624	6.2	▲3.3
BVB/FW	Ilona Nicklisch	1,007	3.9		733	2.8	
Greens	Dirk Marx	836	3.2	▲1.0	833	3.2	▲1.4
NPD					688	2.6	
DVU					590	2.3	▼7.1
RRP					133	0.5	
50Plus					125	0.5	▼2.5
Die-Volksinitiative					67	0.3	
REP					52	0.2	
DKP					33	0.1	Steady
Informal votes		1,139			792		
Total valid votes		25,844			26,191		
Turnout		26,983	63.4	▲7.2			
Left hold	Majority	501	2.0	▼5.9			

=== 2004 election ===
State election (2004): Oberspreewald-Lausitz II/Spree-Neiße IV
Notes:	Blue background denotes the winner of the electorate vote. Pink background denotes a candidate elected from their party list. Yellow background denotes an electorate win by a list member, or other incumbent. A ✓ or ✗ denotes status of any incumbent, win or lose respectively.						
Party	Candidate	Votes	%	±%	Party votes	%	±%
PDS	Gerd-Rüdiger Hoffmann	8,711	35.60		7,210	29.15	
SPD	Martina Gregor-Ness	6,778	27.70		7,112	28.75	
CDU	Jürgen Bretschneider	5,513	22.53		4,695	18.98	
Greens					2,318	9.37	
FDP	Bärbel Lindner	1,116	4.56		709	2.87	
Independent	Ilona Nicklisch	1,005	4.11				
50Plus					746	3.02	
Familie					706	2.85	
Schill	Klaus Häßler	819	3.35		166	0.67	
Greens	Hans-Michael Luther	529	2.16		443	1.79	
Gray Panthers					175	0.71	
AUB-Brandenburg					133	0.54	
Yes Brandenburg					113	0.46	
BRB					94	0.38	
AfW (Free Voters)					88	0.36	
DKP					28	0.11	
Informal votes		911			646		
Total valid votes		24,471			24,736		
Turnout		25,382	56.17				
PDS win new seat	Majority	1,933	7.90				

== See also ==
- Politics of Brandenburg
- Landtag of Brandenburg
