= Malxe =

River in Germany

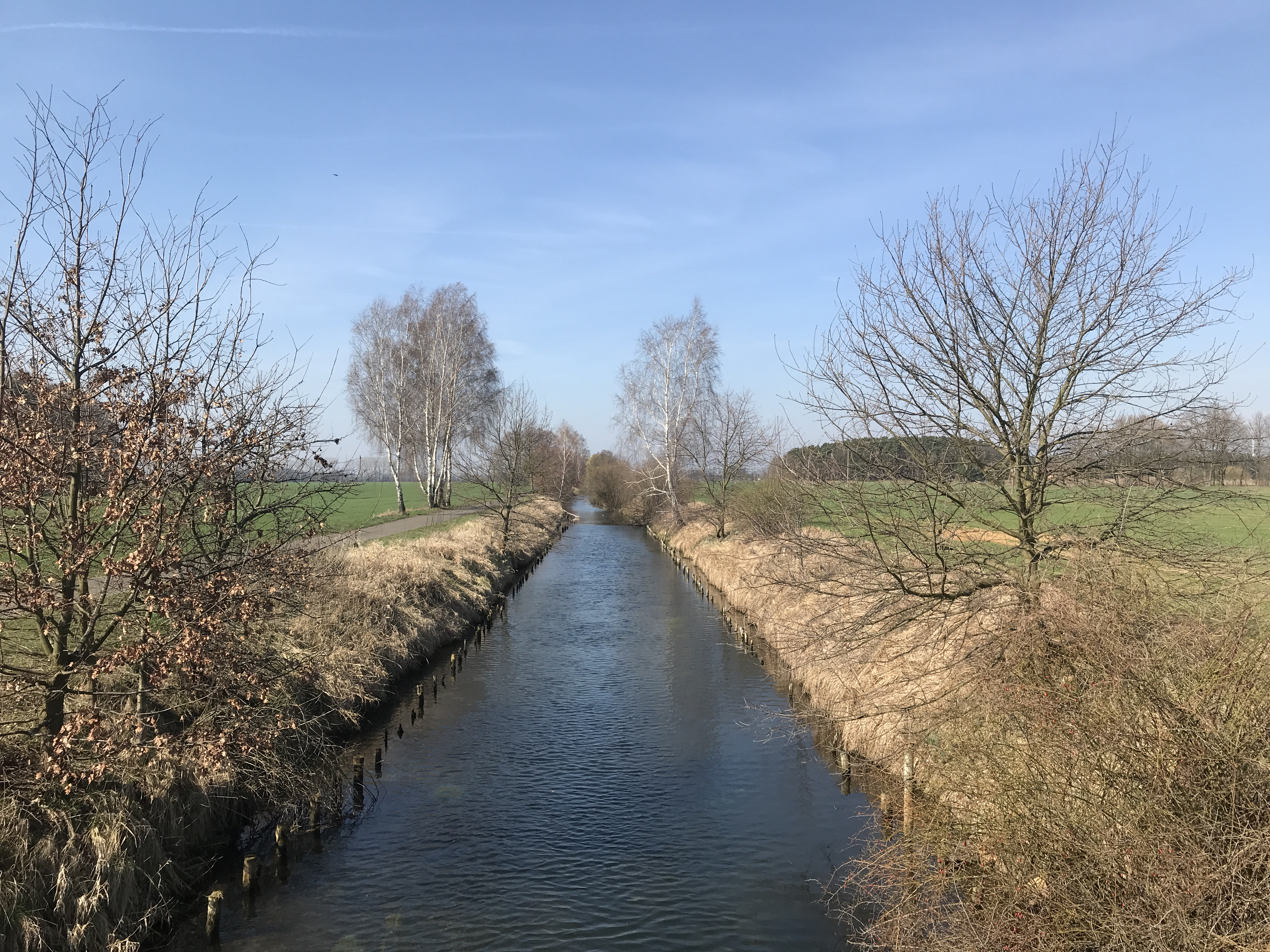

Location
- Country: Germany
- States: Brandenburg

Physical characteristics
- Source
  - location: Near Döbern
  - elevation: 130 m a.s.l.
- 2nd source
  - location: Near Heinersbrück
- Mouth
  - location: Großes Fließ
  - coordinates: 51.8544°N 14.2608°E
- Length: 45km

Basin features
- Progression: Großes Fließ→ Spree→ Havel→ Elbe→ North Sea

Malxe (German pronunciation: [ˈmalksə]; Lower Sorbian: Małksa) is a river in Brandenburg, Germany. Due to open pit lignite mining, its upper course and lower course have been separated.

The upper course, which is also referred to as Malxe-Neiße-Kanal, leads from Döbern along Forst (Lausitz) to Briesnig, where it discharges into the Lusatian Neisse. The Malxe proper, the former lower course, starts at the western edge of the Jänschwalde open pit mine, in Heinersbrück, and flows through Peitz to Schmogrow-Fehrow, where it joins the Hammergraben, forming the Großes Fließ.

== See also ==
- List of rivers of Brandenburg
