= Luckau =

- Town
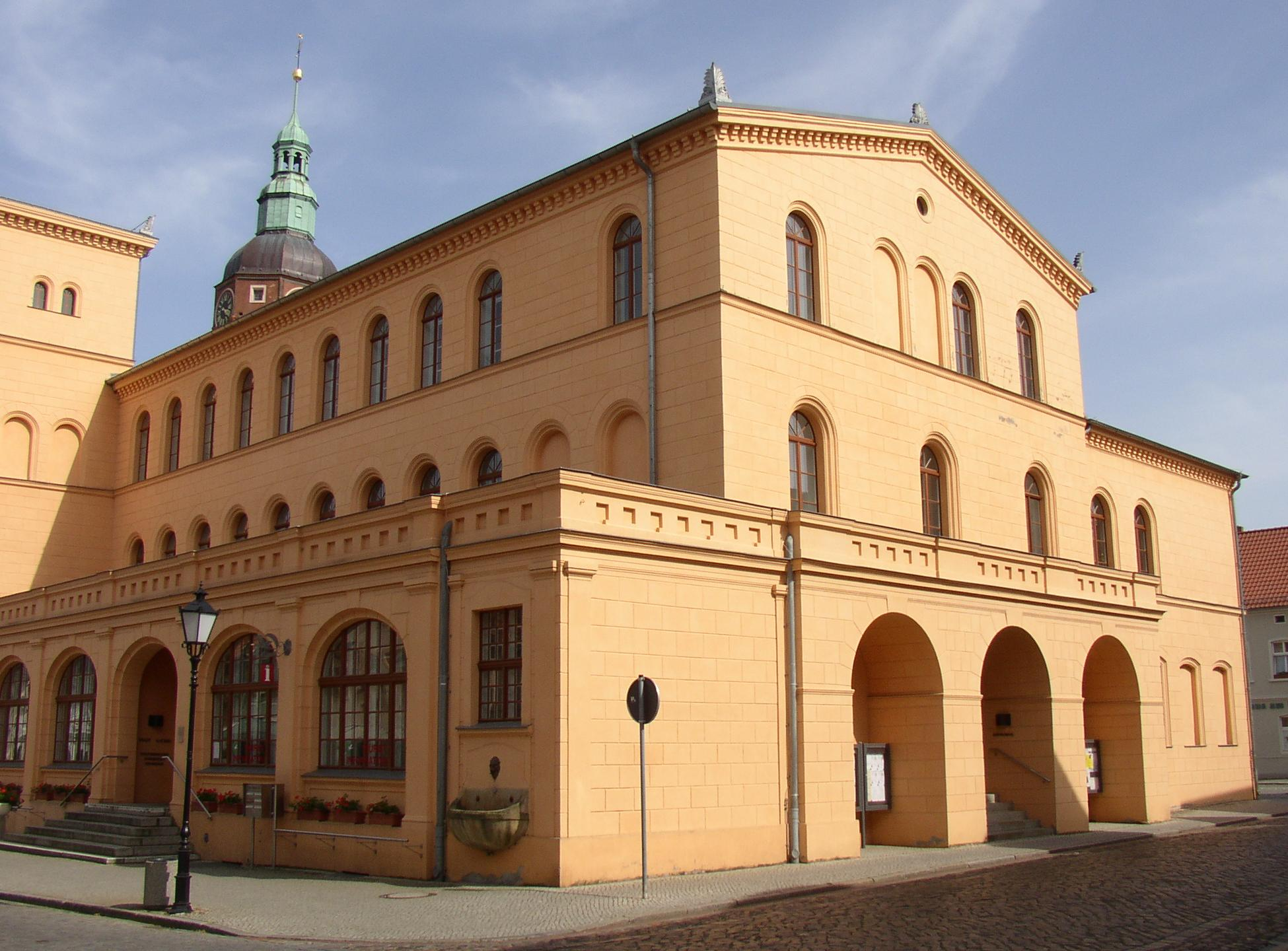
- Town hall

- Coat of arms

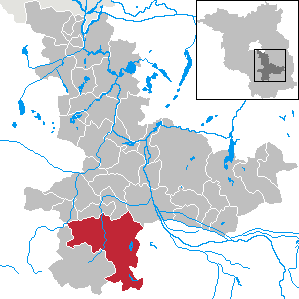
- Location of Luckau within Dahme-Spreewald district
- Interactive map of Luckau
- Location within Germany Location within Brandenburg
- Coordinates: 51°51′00″N 13°43′00″E
- Country: Germany
- State: Brandenburg
- District: Dahme-Spreewald

Government
  - Mayor (2017–25): Gerald Lehmann (Ind.)

Area
  - Total: 207.44 km^{2} (80.09 sq mi)
- Elevation: 65 m (213 ft)

Population (2025-12-31)
  - Total: 9,138
  - Density: 44.05/km^{2} (114.1/sq mi)
- Time zone: UTC+01:00 (CET)
  - Summer (DST): UTC+02:00 (CEST)
- Postal codes: 15926
- Dialling codes: 03544
- Vehicle registration: LDS
- Website: www.luckau.de

Luckau (German pronunciation: [ˈlʊkaʊ]; Lower Sorbian: Łukow) is a city in the district of Dahme-Spreewald in the federal state of Brandenburg, in eastern Germany. Known for its beauty, it has been dubbed "the Pearl of Lower Lusatia".

== Origin of the name ==
The name appears to be a locative form of a Sorbian root meaning marsh, moor, or wet meadow, in reference to the surrounding countryside.

== History ==
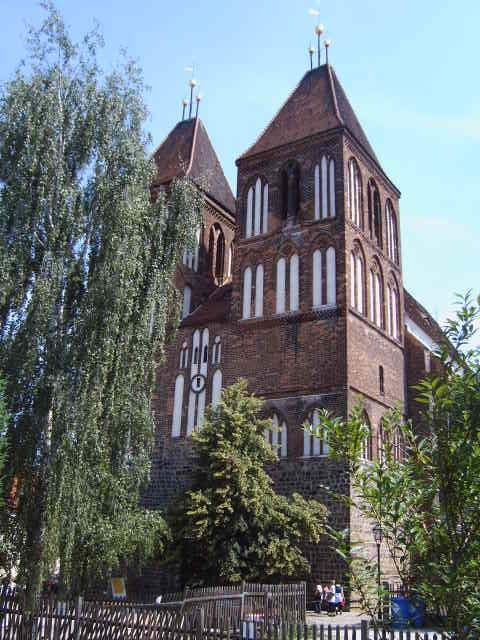
Church of St. Nicholas in Luckau

The oldest preserved document mentioning the city of Luckau (using the Slavic form Lukow) dates from the year 1276. Since the Middle Ages, the town was located on an important trade route, called the "Salt Road", which was used to transport salt from Halle to Lusatia and further east to Poland. In 1468, the town opposed Bohemian (Czech) King George of Poděbrady and passed to Matthias Corvinus of Hungary. In 1490, it passed from Hungary back to the Kingdom of Bohemia, then ruled by Polish prince Vladislaus II. A prosperous town, it became one of the capitals of Lower Lusatia in 1492. By a decree by Margrave Heinrich von Meißen, all the Jewish inhabitants in Luckau were set to be expelled by March 8, 1500.

By the terms of the Peace of Prague in 1635 during the Thirty Years' War the Margravate of Lower Lusatia was conveyed to the Elector of Saxony, which territory up until that time had been a Bohemian fiefdom.

During the Thirty Years' War the Swedish fortified the city as a principal base. It suffered severe damage as a result of the ensuing conflicts.

On 4 June 1813 during the Napoleonic "War of Liberation", the advance of the French army was halted by the victory of the Russo-Prussian forces of the Sixth Coalition and an armistice was declared in the Truce of Pläswitz. This was briefly interrupted on 6 June by a skirmish at the battle of Luckau.

While conducting an inspection of his troops, Napoleon stayed overnight in Luckau from 20 to 21 July 1813. He requisitioned quarters in the top storey of the house belonging to the richest man in the city, a merchant named Vogt. Because it was very cold during that July night, Napoleon had a copper warming pan brought to his bed. This warming pan may still be seen in the Museum of Lower Lusatia in Luckau.

As a result of a decree of the Congress of Vienna in 1815, Lower Lusatia was ceded to Prussia, the Margravate was dissolved, and the region of Lower Lusatia, and thus also the city of Luckau, were annexed to the Province of Brandenburg. One of the main escape routes for insurgents of the unsuccessful Polish November Uprising from partitioned Poland to the Great Emigration led through the town.

From 1816 to 1993 Luckau held the status of Kreisstadt or "county seat"; it has now been included in the rural district of Dahme-Spreewald, of which the capital is Lübben. Luckau has been a well-known peat-bath spa (Moorbad) since the beginning of the 20th century.

During World War II, it was the location of a Nazi prison with multiple forced labour subcamps in the region.

== Demography ==
Development of Population since 1875 within the Current Boundaries (Blue Line: Population; Dotted Line: Comparison to Population Development of Brandenburg state; Grey Background: Time of Nazi rule; Red Background: Time of Communist rule)

Recent Population Development and Projections (Population Development before Census 2011 (blue line); Recent Population Development according to the Census in Germany in 2011 (blue bordered line); Official projections for 2005-2030 (yellow line); for 2020-2030 (green line); for 2017-2030 (scarlet line)

Luckau: Population development
within the current boundaries (2020)

Year	Pop.	±% p.a.
1875	11,475	—
1890	11,369	−0.06%
1910	10,947	−0.19%
1925	11,083	+0.08%
1933	11,117	+0.04%
1939	11,022	−0.14%
1946	15,343	+4.84%
1950	14,672	−1.11%
1964	13,011	−0.85%
1971	12,746	−0.29%
1981	12,318	−0.34%
1985	11,926	−0.81%
1989	11,514	−0.88%
1990	11,389	−1.09%
1991	11,116	−2.40%

Year	Pop.	±% p.a.
1992	11,138	+0.20%
1993	10,970	−1.51%
1994	10,924	−0.42%
1995	10,751	−1.58%
1996	10,920	+1.57%
1997	10,964	+0.40%
1998	10,883	−0.74%
1999	11,089	+1.89%
2000	11,104	+0.14%
2001	10,919	−1.67%
2002	10,736	−1.68%
2003	10,604	−1.23%
2004	10,556	−0.45%
2005	10,642	+0.81%
2006	10,477	−1.55%

Year	Pop.	±% p.a.
2007	10,452	−0.24%
2008	10,334	−1.13%
2009	10,231	−1.00%
2010	10,130	−0.99%
2011	9,818	−3.08%
2012	9,738	−0.81%
2013	9,610	−1.31%
2014	9,558	−0.54%
2015	9,533	−0.26%
2016	9,574	+0.43%
2017	9,729	+1.62%
2018	9,582	−1.51%
2019	9,565	−0.18%
2020	9,443	−1.28%

== Sightseeing ==
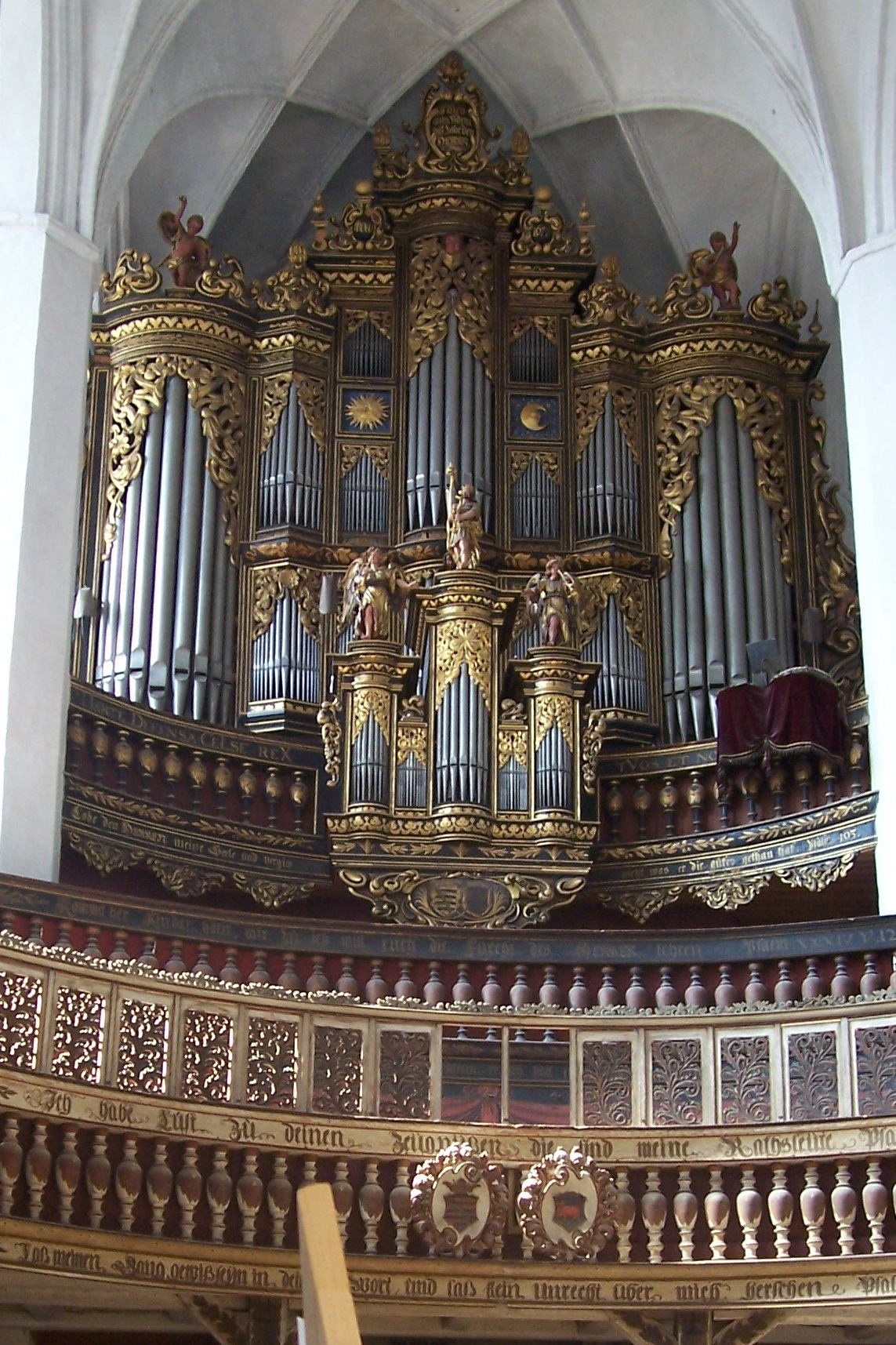
Organ of St. Nicholas Church

- Lutheran Church of St. Nicholas

The gothic, twin-towered hall church was built during the period from 1375 until 1437. During a fire in the church in 1644 most of the mediaeval furnishings were lost. The restoration of the interior was carried out under the direction of the architects Petzsch and Bärgt in a rich baroque style. The organ, which is exceptionally beautiful, was installed by the Leipzig organ manufacturing company Donath during the years from 1672 to 1674. It presents a richly panelled baroque appearance. Around the year 2002 renovation measures were undertaken at the church.

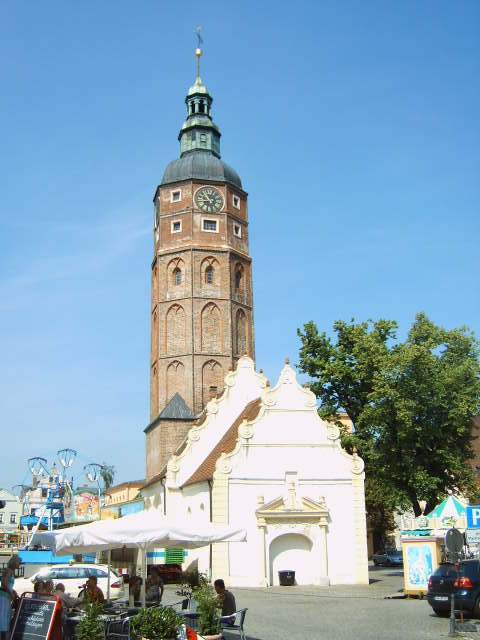
Chapel of St. George with the Hausmann Tower

- Hausmann tower with the Chapel of St. George

The chapel and its grounds, which were built during the 14th century, have been used only for secular purposes since the Reformation.

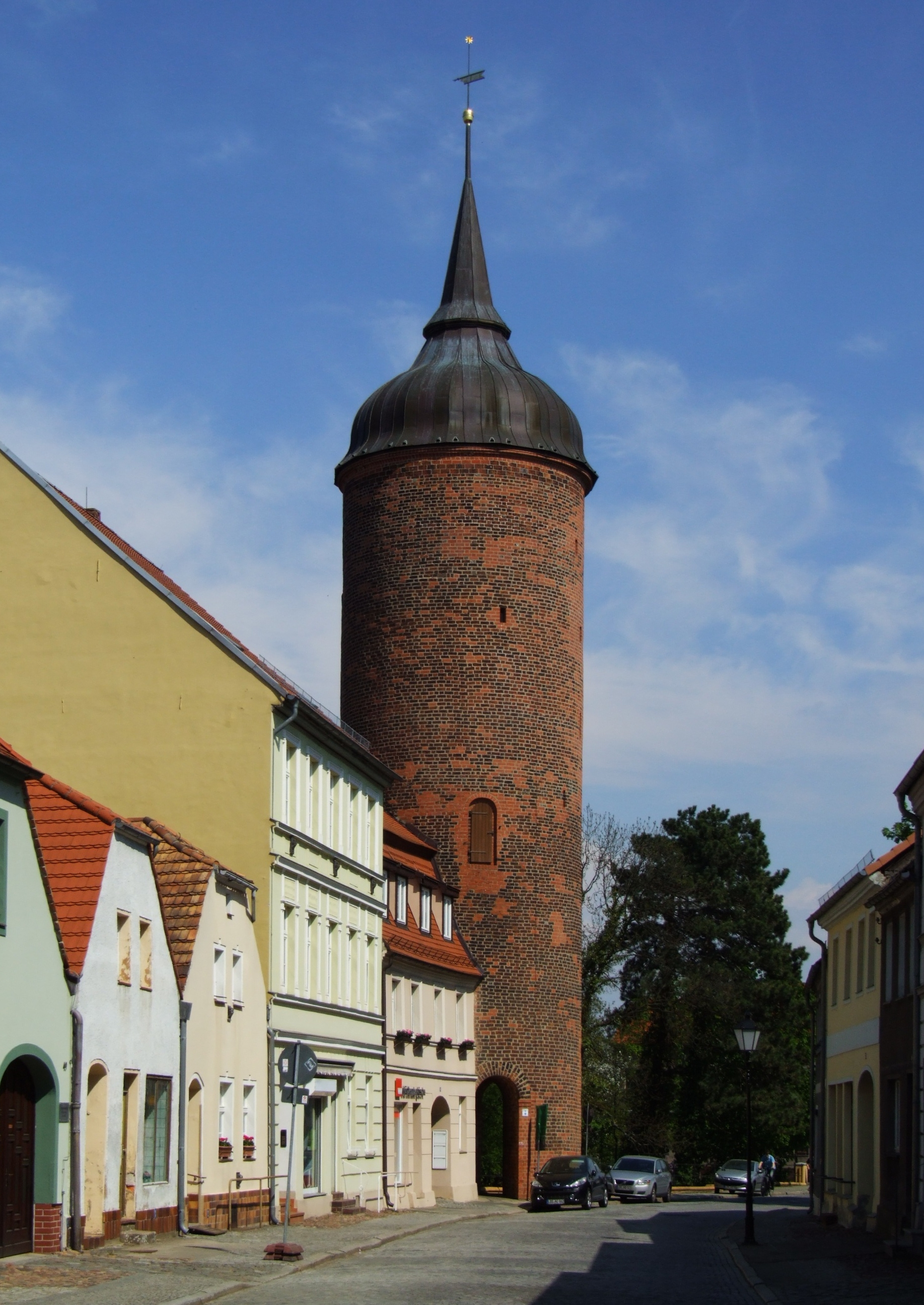
The Red Tower, remnant of the city fortifications

- Town fortifications

Large portions of the old city wall from the 13th and 14th centuries have been preserved. Particularly remarkable is the Red Tower (Roter Turm).

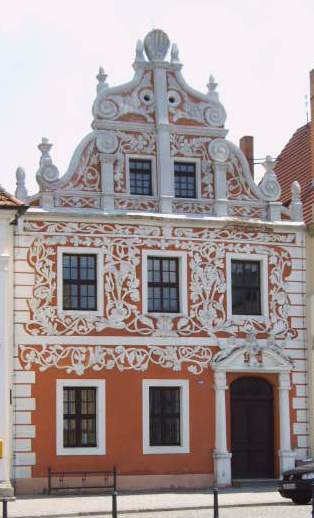
House on the Marketplace

- Baroque gabled houses

The beautiful marketplace is bordered by numerous baroque dwelling houses. Some of these structures were richly adorned with decorative stucco by Italian baroque master-builders.

- Town hall

The town hall (Rathaus) was built during the 17th century, and later remodeled in neoclassical style.

== Transport ==
Luckau is located at the nexus of federal motorway (Bundesstraße) B87 (Stadtilm-Frankfurt/Oder), B96 (Sassnitz-Zittau) and B102 (starting at Wusterhausen), which ends in Luckau.

Located approximately 10 kilometers to the east of Luckau is exit "Duben" on Autobahn A13. The church of the nearby village of Duben has also been designated as an "Autobahn church."

There is a railway station of the German Railway Corporation ("DB") on the Berlin-Dresden line 10 km west to the city. The name of the station is "Luckau-Uckro". It is being served by Regional-Express line RE5 Rostock-Berlin-Elsterwerda every 2 hours. In rush hours, the 2-hour cycle is increased to an 1-hour cycle by extra trains of the line RE5 Stralsund-Berlin-Finsterwalde.

Bus services are provided by Regionale Verkehrsgesellschaft Dahme-Spreewald mbH. Most important connections are the lines 466 running to Dahme/Mark via Luckau-Uckro station and line 472 to Lübben (Spreewald) via Lübben station providing train connections to lines RE2 Wismar/Wittenberge-Berlin-Cottbus and Regionalbahn service RB24 Eberswalde-Berlin-Senftenberg every hour (only in 2-hour cycle on weekends).

== Districts of the city ==
- Bergen
- Cahnsdorf
- de:Duben (in German)
  - Alteno

Until it was deactivated by the Bundeswehr there was a military airfield with paved runways, a fuel depot and a munitions bunker in Alteno. There were also remotely controlled automatic PAR-8 radio beacons along the main landing approach in the vicinity of Alteno "A" at 1000m and at Groß Radden "AO" at 4000m. During the latter period of the German Democratic Republic it served as an auxiliary and training field for fighter squadron JG-1 in Holzdorf bei Jessen/Elster. The call designation of the field was "Arno". At present the grounds are used for racing by the Luckau motorcycle club.

  - Freimfelde
  - Kaden
- Egsdorf
- Freesdorf
- Fürstlich Drehna (in German)
  - Tugam
- Gießmannsdorf
- Görlsdorf
  - Frankendorf
  - Garrenchen
- Karche-Zaacko – a city quarter with approximately 200 inhabitants in 2006.
  - Karche is first documented in 1452 as Karchaw. A Slavic name, it is derived from the personal name Korch. In 1572 it is documented as Karcho.
  - Schollen
- Kreblitz
- Kümmritz
- Paserin
- Rüdingsdorf
- Schlabendorf
- Uckro
- Wierigsdorf
- Willmersdorf-Stöbritz
- Terpt
- Zieckau
- Zöllmersdorf

== International relations ==
=== Twin towns — Sister cities ===
Luckau is twinned with:

- Sława, Poland

== People ==
- Fabian Jank (born 1996), politician
