= Werben =

Werben may refer to:

- Werben (Elbe), in Saxony-Anhalt, Germany
- Werben (Spreewald), in Brandenburg, Germany
