= Neiße-Malxetal =

Neiße-Malxetal Mała Nysa Niemiecka
- Municipality
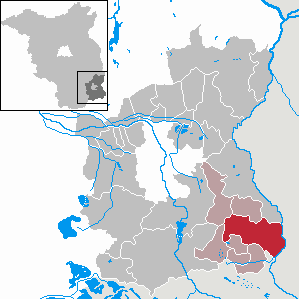
- Location of Neiße-Malxetal; Mała Nysa Niemiecka within Spree-Neiße district
- Interactive map of Neiße-Malxetal; Mała Nysa Niemiecka
- Location within Germany Location within Brandenburg
- Coordinates: 51°37′00″N 14°41′59″E
- Country: Germany
- State: Brandenburg
- District: Spree-Neiße
- Municipal assoc.: Döbern-Land
- Subdivisions: 5 Ortsteile

Government
  - Mayor (2024–29): René Prüfer (AfD)

Area
  - Total: 82.57 km^{2} (31.88 sq mi)
- Elevation: 120 m (390 ft)

Population (2025-12-31)
  - Total: 1,497
  - Density: 18.13/km^{2} (46.96/sq mi)
- Time zone: UTC+01:00 (CET)
  - Summer (DST): UTC+02:00 (CEST)
- Postal codes: 03159
- Dialling codes: 035600
- Vehicle registration: SPN

Neiße-Malxetal (German pronunciation: [ˈnaɪsə ˈmalksəˌtaːl], lit. 'Neisse-Malxe Valley'; Lower Sorbian: Dolina Nyse a Małkse) is a municipality in the district of Spree-Neiße, in Lower Lusatia, Brandenburg, Germany.

== History ==
From 1815 to 1947, the constituent localities of Neiße-Malxetal were part of the Prussian Province of Brandenburg. From 1952 to 1990, they were part of the Bezirk Cottbus of East Germany. On 31 December 2001, the municipality of Neiße-Malxetal was formed by merging the municipalities of Groß Kölzig, Jerischke, Jocksdorf, Klein Kölzig and Preschen.

== Demography ==
Development of Population since 1875 within the Current Boundaries (Blue Line: Population; Dotted Line: Comparison to Population Development of Brandenburg state; Grey Background: Time of Nazi rule; Red Background: Time of Communist rule)

Neiße-Malxetal: Population development
within the current boundaries (2013)

Year	Pop.	±% p.a.
1875	1,804	—
1890	1,822	+0.07%
1910	2,868	+2.29%
1925	3,122	+0.57%
1933	3,267	+0.57%
1939	3,145	−0.63%
1946	3,283	+0.62%
1950	3,532	+1.84%
1964	3,011	−1.13%
1971	2,868	−0.69%
1981	2,190	−2.66%
1985	2,058	−1.54%
1989	1,994	−0.79%
1990	1,965	−1.45%
1991	1,909	−2.85%
1992	1,874	−1.83%
1993	1,868	−0.32%
1994	1,856	−0.64%
1995	1,842	−0.75%
1996	1,855	+0.71%

Year	Pop.	±% p.a.
1997	1,885	+1.62%
1998	1,895	+0.53%
1999	1,926	+1.64%
2000	1,947	+1.09%
2001	1,943	−0.21%
2002	1,937	−0.31%
2003	1,912	−1.29%
2004	1,910	−0.10%
2005	1,886	−1.26%
2006	1,856	−1.59%
2007	1,836	−1.08%
2008	1,800	−1.96%
2009	1,799	−0.06%
2010	1,799	+0.00%
2011	1,740	−3.28%
2012	1,712	−1.61%
2013	1,699	−0.76%
2014	1,662	−2.18%
2015	1,657	−0.30%
2016	1,624	−1.99%
