= Samuel Guttmann =

- Born: 1839; Ostrowo, Prussia
- Died: December 22, 1893 (aged 53–54); Berlin, German Empire
- Citizenship: Germany
- Occupation: Medical writer

Samuel Guttmann (1839 - December 22, 1893) was a Jewish-German gynecologist and medical writer who contributed to the field of medical journalism.

== Biography ==
Samuel Guttmann was born in Ostrowo, Prussia, in 1839.

he graduated from the University of Berlin in 1864 and initially practiced in Drebkau, Silesia province, before settling in Berlin. Guttmann served as a regular contributor, later becoming editor of the Deutsche Medizinische Wochenschrift from 1885 (German Medical Weekly) and the Reichsmedizinal-Kalender (Reich Medical Calendar). He also collaborated on publications about the 1889–1890 pandemic.

Guttmann wrote numerous essays on medical subjects before his death in Berlin on 22 December 1893.
