= Jämlitz-Klein Düben =

- Municipality
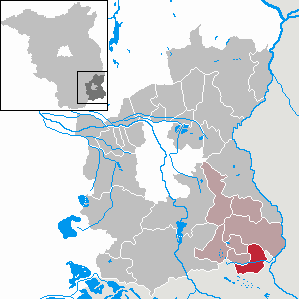
- Location of Jämlitz-Klein Düben within Spree-Neiße district
- Interactive map of Jämlitz-Klein Düben
- Location within Germany Location within Brandenburg
- Coordinates: 51°34′00″N 14°40′00″E
- Country: Germany
- State: Brandenburg
- District: Spree-Neiße
- Municipal assoc.: Döbern-Land
- Subdivisions: 2 Ortsteile

Government
  - Mayor (2024–29): Helga Britze

Area
  - Total: 28.63 km^{2} (11.05 sq mi)
- Elevation: 125 m (410 ft)

Population (2025-12-31)
  - Total: 435
  - Density: 15.2/km^{2} (39.4/sq mi)
- Time zone: UTC+01:00 (CET)
  - Summer (DST): UTC+02:00 (CEST)
- Postal codes: 03130
- Dialling codes: 035771
- Vehicle registration: SPN

Jämlitz-Klein Düben (Lower Sorbian: Jemjelica-Źěwink) is a municipality in the district of Spree-Neiße, in Brandenburg, Germany.

== Demography ==
Development of population since 1875 within the current Boundaries (Blue Line: Population; Dotted Line: Comparison to Population development in Brandenburg state; Grey Background: Time of Nazi Germany; Red Background: Time of communist East Germany)

Jämlitz-Klein Düben: Population development
within the current boundaries (2013)

Year	Pop.	±% p.a.
1875	859	—
1890	931	+0.54%
1910	843	−0.50%
1925	826	−0.14%
1933	837	+0.17%
1939	791	−0.94%
1946	766	−0.46%
1950	879	+3.50%
1964	807	−0.61%
1971	759	−0.87%
1981	599	−2.34%
1985	569	−1.28%
1989	545	−1.07%
1990	522	−4.22%
1991	505	−3.26%
1992	495	−1.98%
1993	489	−1.21%
1994	486	−0.61%
1995	500	+2.88%
1996	534	+6.80%

Year	Pop.	±% p.a.
1997	542	+1.50%
1998	568	+4.80%
1999	561	−1.23%
2000	572	+1.96%
2001	561	−1.92%
2002	550	−1.96%
2003	545	−0.91%
2004	537	−1.47%
2005	521	−2.98%
2006	501	−3.84%
2007	502	+0.20%
2008	495	−1.39%
2009	481	−2.83%
2010	491	+2.08%
2011	486	−1.02%
2012	489	+0.62%
2013	476	−2.66%
2014	487	+2.31%
2015	482	−1.03%
2016	473	−1.87%
