= Fabian Jank =

German politician (born 1996)

Member of the Landtag of Brandenburg
- Incumbent
- Assumed office 17 October 2024
- Preceded by: Wolfgang Roick
- Constituency: Oberspreewald-Lausitz II/Spree-Neiße IV

Personal details
- Born: 1996 (age 29–30) Luckau
- Party: Alternative for Germany (since 2023)

Fabian Jank (born 1996 in Luckau) is a German politician serving as a member of the Landtag of Brandenburg since 2024. He has been a member of the Alternative for Germany since 2023.
