= Döbern-Land =

- Amt
- Map of Spree-Neiße highlighting Döbern-Land
- Interactive map of Döbern-Land
- Location within Germany Location within Brandenburg
- Coordinates: 51°37′N 14°36′E
- Country: Germany
- State: Brandenburg
- District: Spree-Neiße
- Seat: Döbern
- Subdivisions: 7 municipalities

Area
  - Total: 251.47 km^{2} (97.09 sq mi)

Population (2025-12-31)
  - Total: 9,909
  - Density: 39.40/km^{2} (102.1/sq mi)
- Time zone: UTC+01:00 (CET)
  - Summer (DST): UTC+02:00 (CEST)
- Website: www.amt-doebern-land.de

Amt Döbern-Land is an Amt ("collective municipality") in the district of Spree-Neiße, in Brandenburg, Germany. Its seat is in Döbern.

The Amt Döbern-Land consists of the following municipalities:

1. Döbern
2. Felixsee
3. Groß Schacksdorf-Simmersdorf
4. Jämlitz-Klein Düben
5. Neiße-Malxetal
6. Tschernitz
7. Wiesengrund

== Demography ==
Development of population since 1875 within the current Boundaries (Blue Line: Population; Dotted Line: Comparison to Population development in Brandenburg state; Grey Background: Time of Nazi Germany; Red Background: Time of communist East Germany)

Recent Population Development and Projections (Population Development before Census 2011 (blue line); Recent Population Development according to the Census in Germany in 2011 (blue bordered line); Official projections for 2005-2030 (yellow line); for 2017-2030 (scarlet line);; for 2020-2030 (green line)

Amt Döbern-Land: Population development
within the current boundaries (2020)

Year	Pop.	±% p.a.
1875	9,612	—
1890	9,895	+0.19%
1910	15,774	+2.36%
1925	16,440	+0.28%
1939	17,151	+0.30%
1950	19,184	+1.02%
1964	18,340	−0.32%
1971	18,128	−0.17%
1981	16,003	−1.24%

Year	Pop.	±% p.a.
1985	15,654	−0.55%
1990	15,480	−0.22%
1995	14,729	−0.99%
2000	14,887	+0.21%
2005	13,754	−1.57%
2010	12,702	−1.58%
2015	11,835	−1.40%
2020	10,574	−2.23%
2025	9,909	−1.29%
