= Döbern =

Town in Brandenburg, Germany

- Town
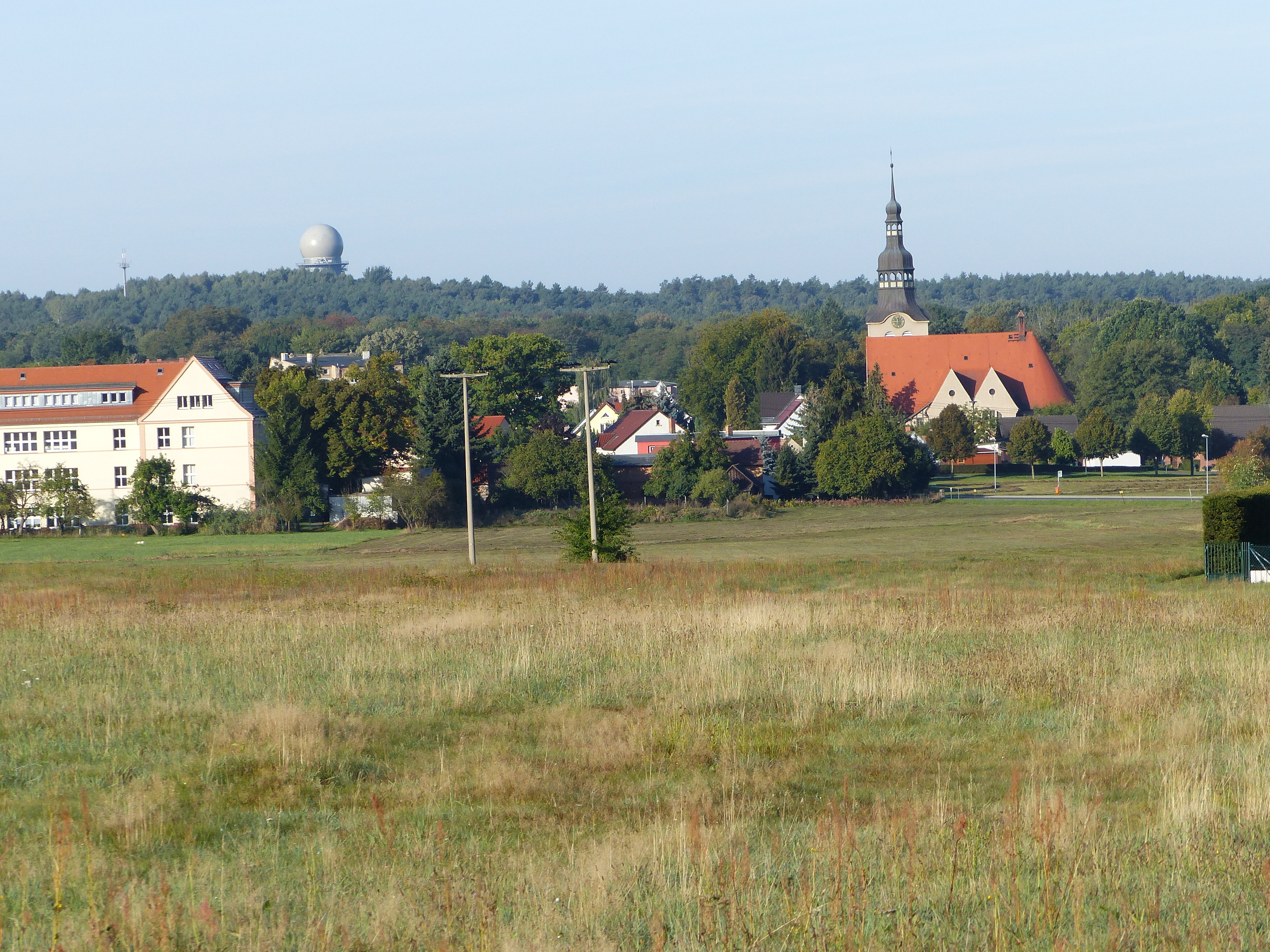
- View towards Döbern

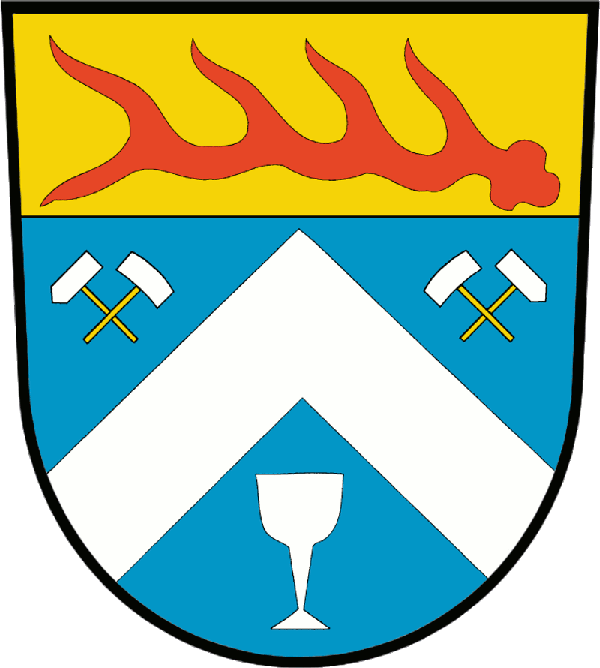
- Flag Coat of arms

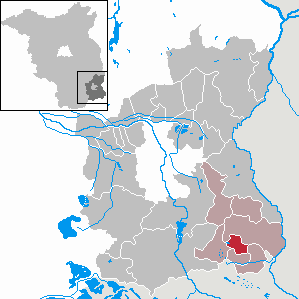
- Location of Döbern within Spree-Neiße district
- Interactive map of Döbern
- Location within Germany Location within Brandenburg
- Coordinates: 51°37′N 14°36′E
- Country: Germany
- State: Brandenburg
- District: Spree-Neiße
- Municipal assoc.: Döbern-Land

Government
  - Mayor (2024–29): Jörg Rakete (SPD)

Area
  - Total: 15.79 km^{2} (6.10 sq mi)
- Elevation: 144 m (472 ft)

Population (2025-12-31)
  - Total: 3,028
  - Density: 191.8/km^{2} (496.7/sq mi)
- Time zone: UTC+01:00 (CET)
  - Summer (DST): UTC+02:00 (CEST)
- Postal codes: 03159
- Dialling codes: 035600
- Vehicle registration: SPN
- Website: www.doebern.de

Döbern (German pronunciation: [ˈdøːbɐn]; Lower Sorbian: Derbno) is a town in the district of Spree-Neiße, in Lower Lusatia, Brandenburg, Germany. It is situated 25 km southeast of Cottbus, and 15 km south of Forst (Lausitz).

== History ==
From 1815 to 1947, Döbern was part of the Prussian Province of Brandenburg. From 1952 to 1990, it was part of the Bezirk Cottbus of East Germany.

== Demography ==
Development of Population since 1875 within the Current Boundaries (Blue Line: Population; Dotted Line: Comparison to Population Development of Brandenburg state; Grey Background: Time of Nazi rule; Red Background: Time of Communist rule)

Döbern: Population development
within the current boundaries (2013)

| Year | Pop. | ±% p.a. |
|---|---|---|
| 1875 | 765 | — |
| 1890 | 1,068 | +2.25% |
| 1910 | 4,135 | +7.00% |
| 1925 | 4,168 | +0.05% |
| 1933 | 4,587 | +1.20% |
| 1939 | 4,632 | +0.16% |
| 1946 | 4,334 | −0.95% |
| 1950 | 4,856 | +2.88% |
| 1964 | 5,009 | +0.22% |
| 1971 | 5,150 | +0.40% |
| 1981 | 5,072 | −0.15% |
| 1985 | 4,883 | −0.94% |
| 1989 | 4,732 | −0.78% |
| 1990 | 4,672 | −1.27% |
| 1991 | 4,593 | −1.69% |
| 1992 | 4,515 | −1.70% |
| 1993 | 4,433 | −1.82% |
| 1994 | 4,389 | −0.99% |
| 1995 | 4,322 | −1.53% |
| 1996 | 4,259 | −1.46% |

| Year | Pop. | ±% p.a. |
|---|---|---|
| 1997 | 4,224 | −0.82% |
| 1998 | 4,186 | −0.90% |
| 1999 | 4,171 | −0.36% |
| 2000 | 4,118 | −1.27% |
| 2001 | 4,053 | −1.58% |
| 2002 | 4,047 | −0.15% |
| 2003 | 4,027 | −0.49% |
| 2004 | 3,983 | −1.09% |
| 2005 | 3,895 | −2.21% |
| 2006 | 3,851 | −1.13% |
| 2007 | 3,786 | −1.69% |
| 2008 | 3,696 | −2.38% |
| 2009 | 3,642 | −1.46% |
| 2010 | 3,618 | −0.66% |
| 2011 | 3,501 | −3.23% |
| 2012 | 3,399 | −2.91% |
| 2013 | 3,351 | −1.41% |
| 2014 | 3,328 | −0.69% |
| 2015 | 3,296 | −0.96% |
| 2016 | 3,291 | −0.15% |
