= Tschernitz =

- Municipality
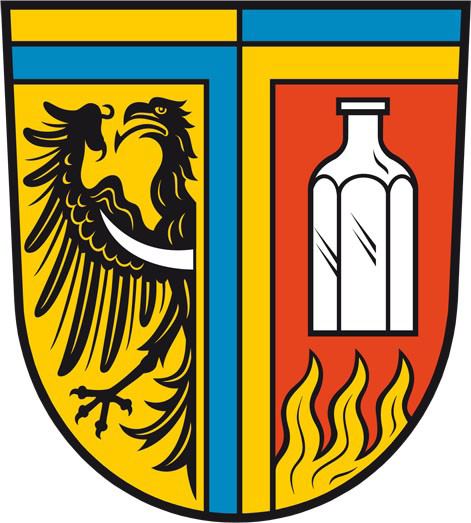
- Coat of arms

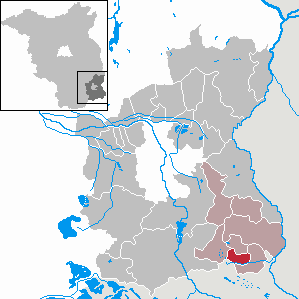
- Location of Tschernitz within Spree-Neiße district
- Interactive map of Tschernitz
- Location within Germany Location within Brandenburg
- Coordinates: 51°34′59″N 14°37′00″E
- Country: Germany
- State: Brandenburg
- District: Spree-Neiße
- Municipal assoc.: Döbern-Land
- Subdivisions: 2 Ortsteile

Government
  - Mayor (2024–29): Olaf Hallasch

Area
  - Total: 13.23 km^{2} (5.11 sq mi)
- Elevation: 129 m (423 ft)

Population (2025-12-31)
  - Total: 1,129
  - Density: 85.34/km^{2} (221.0/sq mi)
- Time zone: UTC+01:00 (CET)
  - Summer (DST): UTC+02:00 (CEST)
- Postal codes: 03130
- Dialling codes: 035600
- Vehicle registration: SPN

Tschernitz (Lower Sorbian: Cersk) is a municipality in the district of Spree-Neiße, in Brandenburg, Germany. It lies on the border with Saxony.

== Demography ==
Development of Population since 1875 within the Current Boundaries (Blue Line: Population; Dotted Line: Comparison to Population Development of Brandenburg state; Grey Background: Time of Nazi rule; Red Background: Time of Communist rule)

Tschernitz: Population development
within the current boundaries (2013)

Year	Pop.	±% p.a.
1875	905	—
1890	965	+0.43%
1910	1,854	+3.32%
1925	1,913	+0.21%
1933	1,974	+0.39%
1939	2,066	+0.76%
1946	1,903	−1.17%
1950	2,141	+2.99%
1964	1,825	−1.13%
1971	1,867	+0.33%
1981	1,649	−1.23%
1985	1,850	+2.92%
1989	1,913	+0.84%
1990	1,960	+2.46%
1991	1,948	−0.61%
1992	1,958	+0.51%
1993	1,954	−0.20%
1994	1,951	−0.15%
1995	1,921	−1.54%
1996	1,883	−1.98%

Year	Pop.	±% p.a.
1997	1,867	−0.85%
1998	1,832	−1.87%
1999	1,825	−0.38%
2000	1,819	−0.33%
2001	1,781	−2.09%
2002	1,717	−3.59%
2003	1,673	−2.56%
2004	1,657	−0.96%
2005	1,609	−2.90%
2006	1,577	−1.99%
2007	1,535	−2.66%
2008	1,486	−3.19%
2009	1,435	−3.43%
2010	1,393	−2.93%
2011	1,297	−6.89%
2012	1,289	−0.62%
2013	1,288	−0.08%
2014	1,280	−0.62%
2015	1,271	−0.70%
2016	1,253	−1.42%
