= Felixsee =

- Municipality
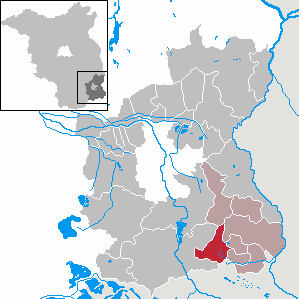
- Location of Felixsee within Spree-Neiße district
- Interactive map of Felixsee
- Location within Germany Location within Brandenburg
- Coordinates: 51°36′00″N 14°31′00″E
- Country: Germany
- State: Brandenburg
- District: Spree-Neiße
- Municipal assoc.: Döbern-Land
- Subdivisions: 5 Ortsteile

Government
  - Mayor (2024–29): Peter Rabe (SPD)

Area
  - Total: 35.41 km^{2} (13.67 sq mi)
- Elevation: 140 m (460 ft)

Population (2025-12-31)
  - Total: 1,786
  - Density: 50.44/km^{2} (130.6/sq mi)
- Time zone: UTC+01:00 (CET)
  - Summer (DST): UTC+02:00 (CEST)
- Postal codes: 03130
- Dialling codes: 035600
- Vehicle registration: SPN
- Website: www.amt-doebern-land.de

Felixsee (Lower Sorbian: Feliksowy jazor) (Upper Sorbian: Feliksowy Jazor) is a municipality in the district of Spree-Neiße, in Brandenburg, Germany.

== Demography ==
Development of population since 1875 within the current Boundaries (Blue Line: Population; Dotted Line: Comparison to Population development in Brandenburg state; Grey Background: Time of Nazi Germany; Red Background: Time of communist East Germany)

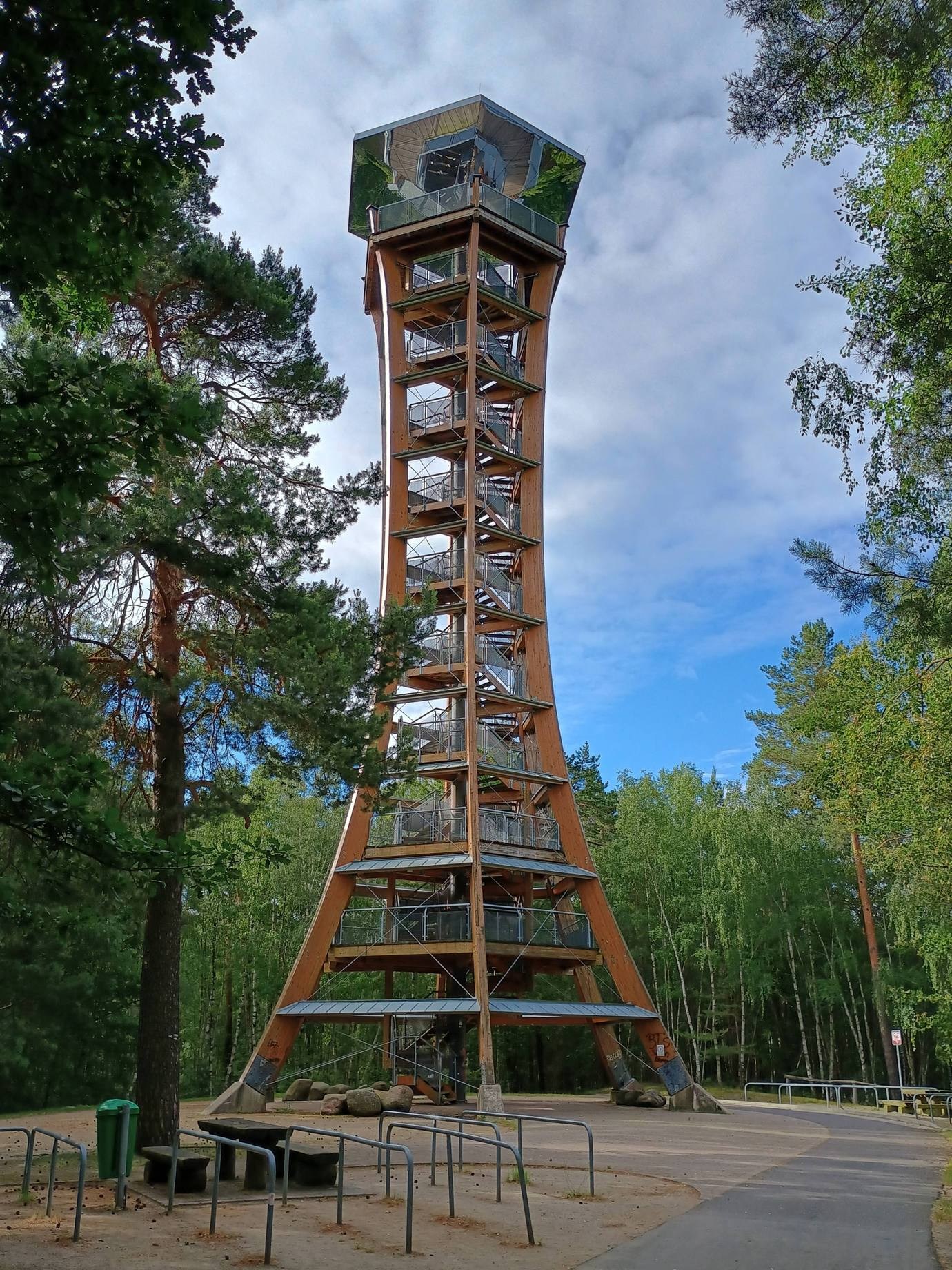
Observation tower near lake Felixsee

Felixsee: Population development
within the current boundaries (2013)

Year	Pop.	±% p.a.
1875	1,765	—
1890	1,710	−0.21%
1910	2,314	+1.52%
1925	2,593	+0.76%
1933	2,713	+0.57%
1939	2,727	+0.09%
1946	2,543	−0.99%
1950	3,050	+4.65%
1964	2,777	−0.67%
1971	2,732	−0.23%
1981	2,506	−0.86%
1985	2,465	−0.41%
1989	2,448	−0.17%
1990	2,414	−1.39%
1991	2,286	−5.30%
1992	2,265	−0.92%
1993	2,300	+1.55%
1994	2,346	+2.00%
1995	2,389	+1.83%
1996	2,420	+1.30%

Year	Pop.	±% p.a.
1997	2,474	+2.23%
1998	2,552	+3.15%
1999	2,549	−0.12%
2000	2,541	−0.31%
2001	2,518	−0.91%
2002	2,481	−1.47%
2003	2,476	−0.20%
2004	2,427	−1.98%
2005	2,382	−1.85%
2006	2,336	−1.93%
2007	2,301	−1.50%
2008	2,249	−2.26%
2009	2,192	−2.53%
2010	2,210	+0.82%
2011	2,090	−5.43%
2012	2,053	−1.77%
2013	1,981	−3.51%
2014	1,929	−2.62%
2015	1,920	−0.47%
2016	1,932	+0.63%
