= Cottbus-Neuhausen Airport =

Airport in Neuhausen/Spree in Germany

Cottbus-Neuhausen Airport Verkehrslandeplatz Cottbus-Neuhausen
- IATA: none; ICAO: EDAP

Summary
- Airport type: Public
- Operator: Flugplatzgesellschaft Cottbus/Neuhausen mbH
- Serves: Cottbus
- Location: Neuhausen/Spree
- Elevation AMSL: 279 ft / 85 m
- Coordinates: 51°41′2″N 14°25′26″E
- Website: flughafen-cottbus.de

Map
- Location of the airport in Brandenburg

Runways
Direction	Length		Surface
Direction	ft	m	Surface
11/29	3,543	1,080	Grass

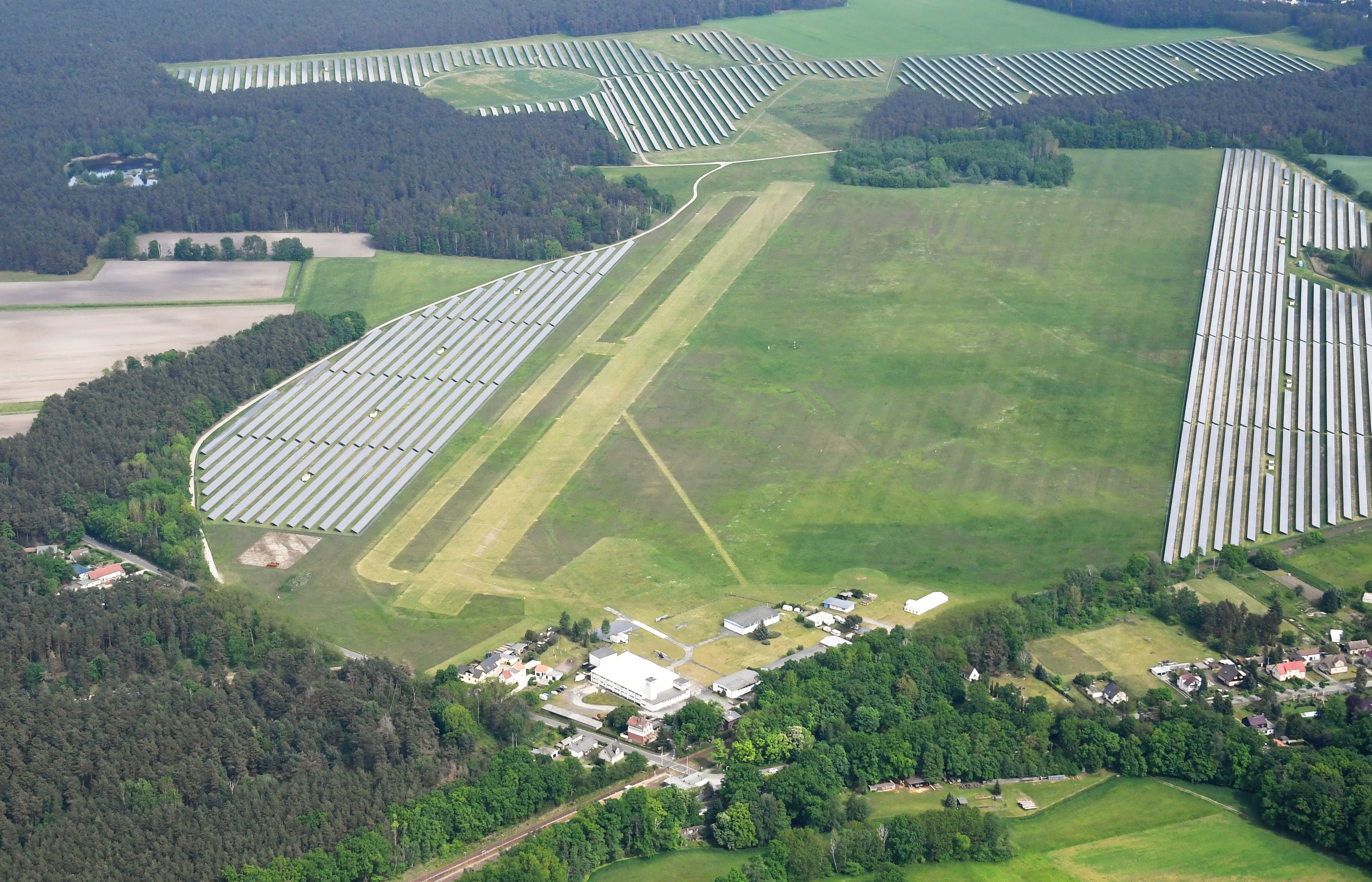
Cottbus-Neuhausen Airport

Cottbus-Neuhausen Airport (ICAO: EDAP) is a civilian airport located in Neuhausen/Spree, approximately 10 km (6.2 miles) south-east of Cottbus in Brandenburg, Germany.
