= Bohrau =

Coordinates: 51°47′2″N 14°35′43″E

Bohrau (Lower Sorbian: Bórow) is an ortsteil of the town of Forst in Lower Lusatia, Brandenburg, Germany, on the Neiße river bordering Poland. It has a population of 109.

== History ==
From 1815 to 1947, Bohrau was part of the Prussian Province of Brandenburg. From 1947 to 1952, it was part of the State of Brandenburg. From 1952 to 1990, it was part of the Bezirk Cottbus of East Germany. Since German reunification in 1990, it has been part of Brandenburg.
