= Henry of Meissen =

Henry of Meissen or Heinrich von Meissen refers to two medieval German poets from Meissen:

- Heinrich Frauenlob (1250s–1318), Middle High German poet
- Henry III, Margrave of Meissen (1215–1288), noble and minnesinger
