= Organ at St. Nicholas Church (Luckau) =

Church organ in Luckau, Germany

The organ at St. Nicholas’ Church, Luckau

The organ at St. Nicholas’ Church in Luckau is one of the most significant historic organs in Brandenburg. It was built in 1672 by Christoph Donat and restored to its present condition by Schuke Orgelbau between 1956 and 1978. Today it has 43 stops across three manuals and a pedalboard. The sun, moon, angel with a trumpet and the figure of King David are movable.

== The previous organ ==
Around 1618, the organ builder Martin Peter Grabow (Berlin) built a ‘swallow’s nest’ organ with 27 stops, which was completely destroyed in the great fire of 1644. Council records from 1646 show that eleven centner of molten tin were sold to Berlin.

== Organ from 1673 ==
During the reconstruction of the church between 1672 and 1673, a new organ was built by the Saxon organ builder Christoph Donati. It combined stylistic elements from northern and southern Germany and had 37 stops across three manuals. It was inaugurated on 6 January 1674. Some defects soon became apparent, including problems with the windchests and the bellows. In 1677, Donati carried out repairs. The organ was subsequently re-inaugurated by Junge. In 1672, the organ had 36 stops across three manuals and a pedalboard. The stop list was as specified in the contract dated 10 July 1672:

I Rückpositiv C–f^{3}
1.	Grobgedackt	8′
2.	Quintadehna	8′
3.	Principal	4′
4.	Mittelflöte	4′
5.	Oktava	2′
6.	Sesquialtera	2fach
7.	Mixtur	3fach
8.	Dulzianregal	16′
9.	Trichterregal	8′

II Hauptwerk C–f^{3}
10.	Grobgedackt	16′
11.	Principal	8′
12.	Rohrflöte	8′
13.	Viol da Gamba	8′
14.	Octava	8′
15.	Juli oder Hollquinta	6′
16.	Triversa oder Querflöte	4′
17.	Klein Gedackt	4′
18.	Quinta	3′
19.	Gemshorn	2′
20.	Sesquialtera	2fach
21.	Mixtur	5-8fach

III Brustwerk C–f^{3}
22.	Grobgedackt Lieblich	8′
23.	Nachthorn	4′
24.	Quinta gedackt oder Naßat	3′
25.	Spitzflöte	2′
26.	Sesquialtera	1fach
27.	Sifflöte	1′
28.	Trompetta	8′

Pedal C–d^{1}
29.	Principal	16′
30.	Subbaß	16′
31.	Oktavbass	8′
32.	klein Octavbass	4′
33.	Mixtur	5fach
34.	Posaune	16′
35.	Trompete	8′
36.	Schalmei	4′

== Lütkemüller’s renovation of 1873 ==
Friedrich Hermann Lütkemüller adapted the organ to the Romantic ideal of sound. He replaced the old windchests and expanded the organ to 40 stops. This alteration was almost equivalent to building a new instrument. He removed the Rückpositiv and built a new Oberwerk. He also altered the Brustwerk façade from three to five pipe sections.

== New building by Schuke, 1956–1978 ==
Between 1959 and 1978, the firm Schuke Orgelbau of Potsdam constructed a new instrument in three phases within the historic case, incorporating the surviving parts by Donat as well as some stops by Lütkemüller. The instrument is committed to the neo-Baroque sound ideal. The work was completed in 1978 with the reconstruction of the layout of the Donat Rückpositiv. Daniel Kunert writes of the instrument: “A reconstruction of the Donat organ would be a fitting project for the future.”

The organ now has 43 stops across three manuals and a pedalboard. Ten of these stops still feature pipes made by Donat. The stop list is as follows:

I Rückpositiv C–f^{3}
1.	Grobgedackt	8′
2.	Quintadena	8′
3.	Principal	4′
4.	Rohrflöte	4′
5.	Oktave	2′
6.	Hohlflöte	2′
7.	Quinte	1 1/3′
8.	Mixtur IV–V	1′
9.	Sesquialtera II
10.	Dulzianregal	16′
11.	Trichterregal	8′
	Tremulant

II Hauptwerk C–f^{3}
12.	Grobgedackt	16′
13.	Principal	8′
14.	Rohrflöte	8′
15.	Viola da Gamba	8′
16.	Oktave	4′
17.	Querflöte	4′
18.	Quinte	2 2/3′
19.	Oktave	2′
20.	Gemshorn	2′
21.	Mixtur VI	2′
22.	Scharf IV	1′
23.	Trompete	8′

III Brustwerk C–f^{3}
24.	Gedackt	8′
25.	Nachthorn	4′
26.	Nassat	2 2/3′
27.	Principal	2′
28.	Spitzflöte	2′
29.	Terz	1 3/5′
30.	Sifflöte	1′
31.	Cimbel III	1′
32.	Glockenton III–IV
33.	Vox humana	8′

Pedal C–d^{1}
34.	Principal	16′
35.	Subbaß	16′
36.	Oktave	8′
37.	Gedacktbaß	8′
38.	Oktave	4′
39.	Bauernflöte	2′
40.	Mixtur V
	Baßaliquote III (vakant)
41.	Posaune	16′
42.	Trompete	8′
43.	Schalmei	4′
	Tremulant

== Organists ==
- Johann Christoph Raubenius (1717–1726)
- Andreas Müller (1726–1775)
- Joachim Klebe (1993–2015)
- Focko Hinken (2015–2020)
- Patricia Marie Kramer (2021–2024)
- Brian Radins (seit 1. Juli 2025)

== Web links ==
- Orgel der Nikolaikirche Luckau from Albrecht Bönisch (German)
- Luckau Nikolaikirche Orgeldatabase (Dutch)
- Luckau Nikolaikirche Orgues France (French)
- Orgelbeschreibung in Organ index (German)
