= Briesen (Spreewald) =

Briesen Brjazyna
- Municipality
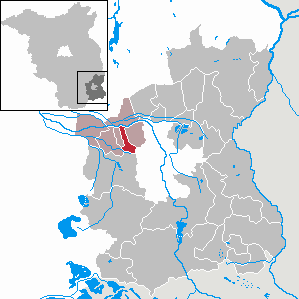
- Location of Briesen within Spree-Neiße district
- Interactive map of Briesen
- Location within Germany Location within Brandenburg
- Coordinates: 51°49′N 14°15′E
- Country: Germany
- State: Brandenburg
- District: Spree-Neiße
- Municipal assoc.: Burg (Spreewald)

Government
  - Mayor (2024–29): Eva-Brigitta Schötzig

Area
  - Total: 9.13 km^{2} (3.53 sq mi)
- Elevation: 58 m (190 ft)

Population (2025-12-31)
  - Total: 773
  - Density: 84.7/km^{2} (219/sq mi)
- Time zone: UTC+01:00 (CET)
  - Summer (DST): UTC+02:00 (CEST)
- Postal codes: 03096
- Dialling codes: 035606
- Vehicle registration: SPN
- Website: www.amt-burg-spreewald.de

Briesen (German pronunciation: [ˈbʁiːzn̩]; Lower Sorbian: Brjazyna, pronounced [ˈbrʲazɨna]) is a municipality in the district of Spree-Neiße, in Lower Lusatia, Brandenburg, Germany.

== History ==
From 1815 to 1947, Briesen was part of the Prussian Province of Brandenburg.

After World War II, Briesen was incorporated into the State of Brandenburg from 1947 to 1952 and the Bezirk Cottbus of East Germany from 1952 to 1990. Since 1990, Briesen has been part of Brandenburg.

== Demography ==
Development of Population since 1875 within the Current Boundaries (Blue Line: Population; Dotted Line: Comparison to Population Development of Brandenburg state; Grey Background: Time of Nazi rule; Red Background: Time of Communist rule)

Briesen [Spreewald]: Population development
within the current boundaries (2013)

Year	Pop.	±% p.a.
1875	487	—
1890	533	+0.60%
1910	531	−0.02%
1925	488	−0.56%
1933	499	+0.28%
1939	531	+1.04%
1946	820	+6.40%
1950	775	−1.40%
1964	667	−1.07%
1971	633	−0.74%
1981	591	−0.68%
1985	561	−1.29%
1989	539	−1.00%
1990	533	−1.11%
1991	528	−0.94%
1992	524	−0.76%
1993	524	+0.00%
1994	556	+6.11%
1995	602	+8.27%
1996	694	+15.28%

Year	Pop.	±% p.a.
1997	761	+9.65%
1998	827	+8.67%
1999	857	+3.63%
2000	871	+1.63%
2001	867	−0.46%
2002	860	−0.81%
2003	851	−1.05%
2004	834	−2.00%
2005	833	−0.12%
2006	824	−1.08%
2007	821	−0.36%
2008	831	+1.22%
2009	825	−0.72%
2010	811	−1.70%
2011	794	−2.10%
2012	807	+1.64%
2013	803	−0.50%
2014	784	−2.37%
2015	767	−2.17%
2016	763	−0.52%
