= Guhrow =

Guhrow Góry
- Municipality
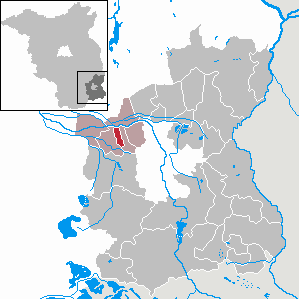
- Location of Guhrow within Spree-Neiße district
- Interactive map of Guhrow
- Location within Germany Location within Brandenburg
- Coordinates: 51°49′N 14°14′E
- Country: Germany
- State: Brandenburg
- District: Spree-Neiße
- Municipal assoc.: Burg (Spreewald)

Government
  - Mayor (2024–29): Frank Engelking

Area
  - Total: 6.62 km^{2} (2.56 sq mi)
- Elevation: 58 m (190 ft)

Population (2025-12-31)
  - Total: 509
  - Density: 76.9/km^{2} (199/sq mi)
- Time zone: UTC+01:00 (CET)
  - Summer (DST): UTC+02:00 (CEST)
- Postal codes: 03096
- Dialling codes: 035606
- Vehicle registration: SPN
- Website: www.amt-burg-spreewald.de

Guhrow (Lower Sorbian: Góry) is a municipality in the district of Spree-Neiße, in Lower Lusatia, Brandenburg, Germany.

== History ==
From 1815 to 1947, Guhrow was part of the Prussian Province of Brandenburg.

After World War II, Guhrow was incorporated into the State of Brandenburg from 1947 to 1952 and the Bezirk Cottbus of East Germany from 1952 to 1990. Since 1990, Guhrow has been part of Brandenburg.

== Demography ==
Development of population since 1875 within the current Boundaries (Blue Line: Population; Dotted Line: Comparison to Population development in Brandenburg state; Grey Background: Time of Nazi Germany; Red Background: Time of communist East Germany)

Guhrow: Population development
within the current boundaries (2013)

Year	Pop.	±% p.a.
1875	500	—
1890	474	−0.36%
1910	465	−0.10%
1925	495	+0.42%
1933	486	−0.23%
1939	477	−0.31%
1946	673	+5.04%
1950	641	−1.21%
1964	547	−1.13%
1971	513	−0.91%
1981	472	−0.83%
1985	464	−0.43%
1989	429	−1.94%
1990	414	−3.50%
1991	403	−2.66%
1992	404	+0.25%
1993	406	+0.50%
1994	409	+0.74%
1995	420	+2.69%
1996	437	+4.05%

Year	Pop.	±% p.a.
1997	452	+3.43%
1998	518	+14.60%
1999	553	+6.76%
2000	582	+5.24%
2001	588	+1.03%
2002	589	+0.17%
2003	586	−0.51%
2004	589	+0.51%
2005	600	+1.87%
2006	585	−2.50%
2007	583	−0.34%
2008	578	−0.86%
2009	563	−2.60%
2010	558	−0.89%
2011	543	−2.69%
2012	546	+0.55%
2013	531	−2.75%
2014	523	−1.51%
2015	514	−1.72%
2016	520	+1.17%
