= Neuhausen/Spree =

Neuhausen/Spree Kopańce/Błota
- Municipality
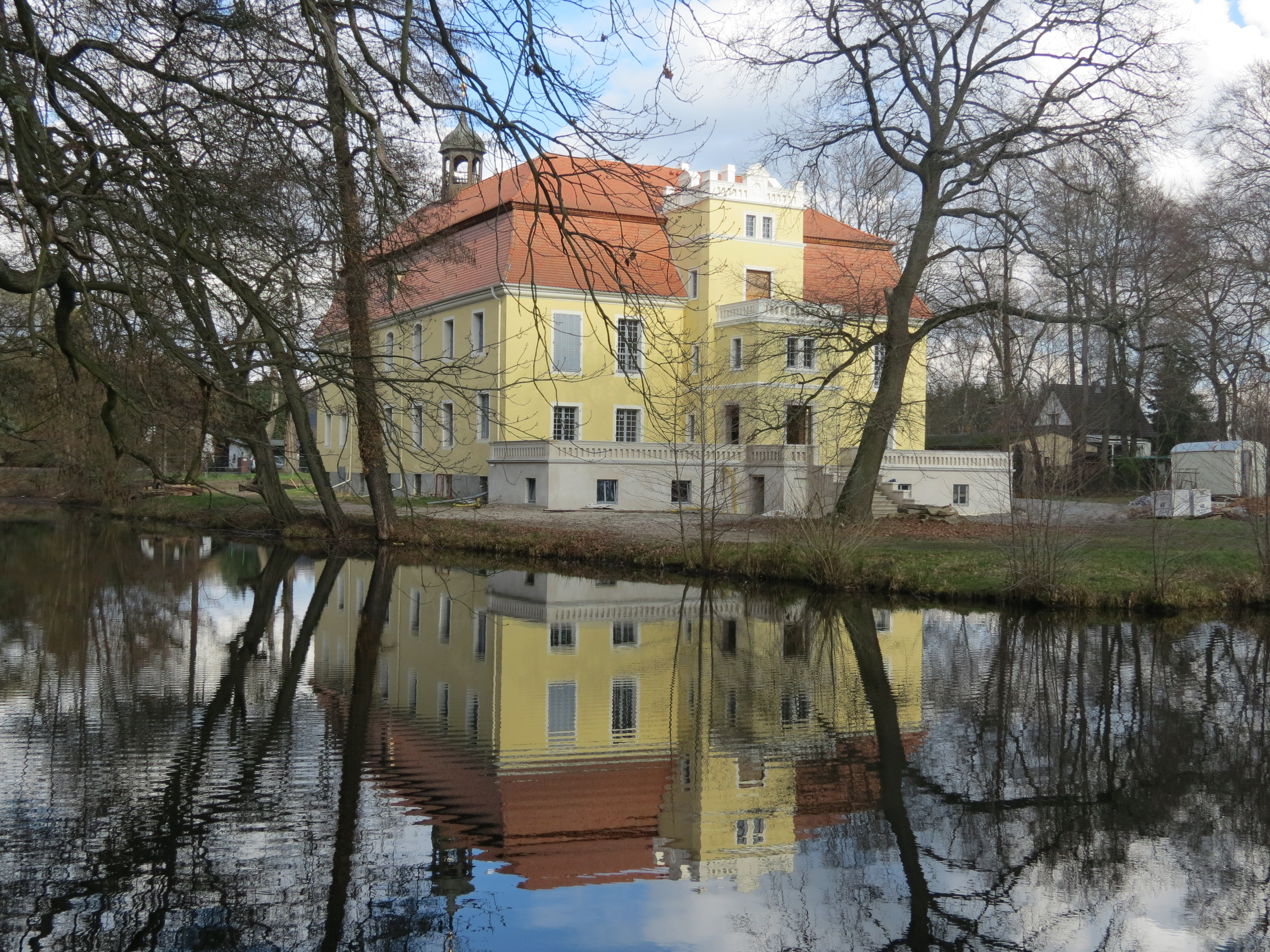
- Baroque castle

- Flag Coat of arms

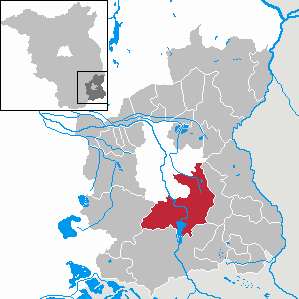
- Location of Neuhausen/Spree; Kopańce/Błota within Spree-Neiße district
- Interactive map of Neuhausen/Spree; Kopańce/Błota
- Location within Germany Location within Brandenburg
- Coordinates: 51°40′59″N 14°25′00″E
- Country: Germany
- State: Brandenburg
- District: Spree-Neiße

Government
  - Mayor (2020–28): Dieter Perko (CDU)

Area
  - Total: 134.22 km^{2} (51.82 sq mi)
- Elevation: 83 m (272 ft)

Population (2025-12-31)
  - Total: 4,762
  - Density: 35.48/km^{2} (91.89/sq mi)
- Time zone: UTC+01:00 (CET)
  - Summer (DST): UTC+02:00 (CEST)
- Postal codes: 03058
- Dialling codes: 035605
- Vehicle registration: SPN
- Website: www.neuhausen-spree.de

Neuhausen/Spree (German pronunciation: [nɔʏˈhaʊzn̩]; Lower Sorbian: Kopańce, pronounced [ˈkɔpanʲtsɛ]) is a municipality in the district of Spree-Neiße, in Lower Lusatia, Brandenburg, Germany.

== History ==
In 1815, Neuhausen was annexed by Prussia, and from 1815 to 1947, it was part of the Province of Brandenburg. As of 1880, it was a predominantly Sorbian village with only 10 German residents.

After World War II, Neuhausen was incorporated into the State of Brandenburg from 1947 to 1952 and the Bezirk Cottbus of East Germany from 1952 to 1990. Since 1990, Neuhausen has been part of Brandenburg.

== Demography ==
Development of population since 1875 within the current Boundaries (Blue Line: Population; Dotted Line: Comparison to Population development in Brandenburg state; Grey Background: Time of Nazi Germany; Red Background: Time of communist East Germany)

Recent Population Development and Projections (Population Development before Census 2011 (blue line); Recent Population Development according to the Census in Germany in 2011 (blue bordered line); Official projections for 2005-2030 (yellow line); for 2017-2030 (scarlet line); for 2020-2030 (green line)

Neuhausen/Spree: Population development
within the current boundaries (2020)

Year	Pop.	±% p.a.
1875	5,367	—
1890	5,568	+0.25%
1910	5,203	−0.34%
1925	5,431	+0.29%
1939	5,308	−0.16%
1950	6,251	+1.50%
1964	5,536	−0.86%

Year	Pop.	±% p.a.
1971	5,325	−0.55%
1981	4,695	−1.25%
1985	4,564	−0.70%
1990	4,285	−1.25%
1995	4,745	+2.06%
2000	5,909	+4.49%
2005	5,723	−0.64%

Year	Pop.	±% p.a.
2010	5,237	−1.76%
2015	4,997	−0.93%
2016	4,952	−0.90%
2017	4,935	−0.34%
2018	4,903	−0.65%
2019	4,941	+0.78%
2020	4,967	+0.53%

== Famous people ==
- Paul Bronisch, sculptor
- Ronny Ziesmer, gymnast

== See also ==
- Cottbus-Neuhausen Airport
