= Burg (Spreewald) =

Burg Bórkowy
- Municipality
- Coat of arms

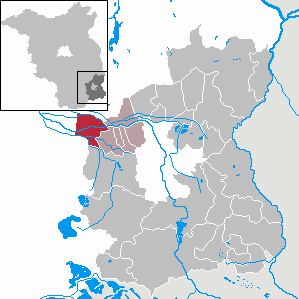
- Location of Burg within Spree-Neiße district
- Interactive map of Burg
- Location within Germany Location within Brandenburg
- Coordinates: 51°50′05″N 14°09′0″E
- Country: Germany
- State: Brandenburg
- District: Spree-Neiße
- Municipal assoc.: Burg (Spreewald)

Government
  - Mayor (2024–29): Hans-Jürgen Dreger

Area
  - Total: 35.16 km^{2} (13.58 sq mi)
- Elevation: 57 m (187 ft)

Population (2025-12-31)
  - Total: 4,125
  - Density: 117.3/km^{2} (303.9/sq mi)
- Demonym(s): German: Burger; Lower Sorbian: Bórkowaŕ (m.), Bórkowaŕka (f.)
- Time zone: UTC+01:00 (CET)
  - Summer (DST): UTC+02:00 (CEST)
- Postal codes: 03096
- Dialling codes: 035603
- Vehicle registration: SPN, FOR, GUB, SPB
- Website: www.amt-burg-spreewald.de

Burg (Spreewald) (German pronunciation: [bʊʁk]; Lower Sorbian: Bórkowy (Błota)) is a municipality in the district of Spree-Neiße, in Lower Lusatia, Brandenburg, Germany.

== History ==
From 1815 to 1947, Burg was part of the Prussian Province of Brandenburg.

After World War II, Burg was incorporated into the State of Brandenburg from 1947 to 1952 and the Bezirk Cottbus of East Germany from 1952 to 1990. Since 1990, Burg has been part of Brandenburg.

== Demography ==
Development of Population since 1875 within the Current Boundaries (Blue Line: Population; Dotted Line: Comparison to Population Development of Brandenburg state; Grey Background: Time of Nazi rule; Red Background: Time of Communist rule)

Burg (Spreewald): Population development
within the current boundaries (2013)

Year	Pop.	±% p.a.
1875	4,782	—
1890	4,605	−0.25%
1910	4,680	+0.08%
1925	4,401	−0.41%
1933	4,463	+0.18%
1939	4,292	−0.65%
1946	5,770	+4.32%
1950	5,259	−2.29%
1964	4,209	−1.58%
1971	4,172	−0.13%
1981	3,843	−0.82%
1985	3,793	−0.33%
1989	3,794	+0.01%
1990	3,763	−0.82%
1991	3,717	−1.22%
1992	3,718	+0.03%
1993	3,789	+1.91%
1994	3,833	+1.16%
1995	3,927	+2.45%
1996	4,060	+3.39%

Year	Pop.	±% p.a.
1997	4,131	+1.75%
1998	4,272	+3.41%
1999	4,406	+3.14%
2000	4,498	+2.09%
2001	4,529	+0.69%
2002	4,577	+1.06%
2003	4,564	−0.28%
2004	4,555	−0.20%
2005	4,556	+0.02%
2006	4,582	+0.57%
2007	4,536	−1.00%
2008	4,469	−1.48%
2009	4,459	−0.22%
2010	4,391	−1.53%
2011	4,357	−0.77%
2012	4,312	−1.03%
2013	4,323	+0.26%
2014	4,335	+0.28%
2015	4,338	+0.07%
2016	4,318	−0.46%
