= Dissen-Striesow =

Dissen-Striesow Dešno-Strjažow
- Municipality
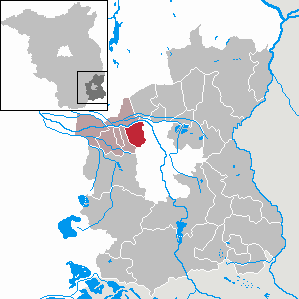
- Location of Dissen-Striesow within Spree-Neiße district
- Interactive map of Dissen-Striesow
- Location within Germany Location within Brandenburg
- Coordinates: 51°49′00″N 14°18′00″E
- Country: Germany
- State: Brandenburg
- District: Spree-Neiße
- Municipal assoc.: Burg (Spreewald)
- Subdivisions: 2 Ortsteile

Government
  - Mayor (2024–29): Nico Jarick

Area
  - Total: 19.72 km^{2} (7.61 sq mi)
- Elevation: 58 m (190 ft)

Population (2025-12-31)
  - Total: 942
  - Density: 47.8/km^{2} (124/sq mi)
- Time zone: UTC+01:00 (CET)
  - Summer (DST): UTC+02:00 (CEST)
- Postal codes: 03096
- Dialling codes: 035606
- Vehicle registration: SPN
- Website: www.dissen-striesow.de

Dissen-Striesow (Lower Sorbian: Dešno-Strjažow, pronounced [ˈdɛʃnɔ ˈstrʲaʒɔw]) is a municipality in the district of Spree-Neiße, in Lower Lusatia, Brandenburg, Germany.

== History ==
The municipality of Dissen-Striesow was formed on 31 December 2001 by merging the municipalities of Dissen and Striesow.

From 1815 to 1947, Dissen and Striesow were part of the Prussian Province of Brandenburg.

After World War II, Dissen and Striesow were incorporated into the State of Brandenburg from 1947 to 1952 and the Bezirk Cottbus of East Germany from 1952 to 1990. Since 1990, they have been part of Brandenburg, since 2001 united as Dissen-Striesow.

== Demography ==
Development of Population since 1875 within the Current Boundaries (Blue Line: Population; Dotted Line: Comparison to Population Development of Brandenburg state; Grey Background: Time of Nazi rule; Red Background: Time of Communist rule)

Dissen-Striesow: Population development
within the current boundaries (2013)

Year	Pop.	±% p.a.
1875	1,169	—
1890	1,147	−0.13%
1910	1,038	−0.50%
1925	1,042	+0.03%
1933	1,039	−0.04%
1939	1,013	−0.42%
1946	1,214	+2.62%
1950	1,127	−1.84%
1964	973	−1.04%
1971	946	−0.40%
1981	919	−0.29%
1985	890	−0.80%
1989	857	−0.94%
1990	849	−0.93%
1991	846	−0.35%
1992	927	+9.57%
1993	866	−6.58%
1994	890	+2.77%
1995	912	+2.47%
1996	946	+3.73%

Year	Pop.	±% p.a.
1997	1,005	+6.24%
1998	1,036	+3.08%
1999	1,069	+3.19%
2000	1,082	+1.22%
2001	1,090	+0.74%
2002	1,102	+1.10%
2003	1,090	−1.09%
2004	1,091	+0.09%
2005	1,097	+0.55%
2006	1,073	−2.19%
2007	1,052	−1.96%
2008	1,042	−0.95%
2009	1,039	−0.29%
2010	1,033	−0.58%
2011	1,014	−1.84%
2012	1,023	+0.89%
2013	1,036	+1.27%
2014	1,013	−2.22%
2015	1,006	−0.69%
2016	993	−1.29%
