= Spree-Neiße =

Coordinates: 51°41′N 14°24′E

Spree-Neiße Wokrejs Sprjewja-Nysa
- District
- Flag Coat of arms
- Country: Germany
- State: Brandenburg
- Capital: Forst

Government
  - District admin.: Harald Altekrüger (CDU)

Area
  - Total: 1,647.8 km^{2} (636.2 sq mi)

Population (31 December 2025)
  - Total: 108,574
  - Density: 65.890/km^{2} (170.66/sq mi)
- Time zone: UTC+01:00 (CET)
  - Summer (DST): UTC+02:00 (CEST)
- Vehicle registration: SPN, FOR, GUB, SPB
- Website: www.landkreis-spree-neisse.de

Spree-Neiße (Lower Sorbian: Wokrejs Sprjewja-Nysa [ˈwɔkrɛjs ˈsprʲɛwʲa ˈnɨsa]) is a Kreis (district) in the southern part of Brandenburg, Germany. Neighboring districts are (from the south clockwise) the districts Bautzen and Görlitz in Saxony, the districts Oberspreewald-Lausitz, Dahme-Spreewald and Oder-Spree. The district-free city Cottbus is surrounded by the district. To the east is Poland.

== Geography ==
The district is located in the region of Lusatia. The Spree river runs through the district, while the Lusatian Neisse river forms the eastern border, which is at the same time the border of Poland.

== History ==
The district was created in 1993 by merging the previous districts Cottbus-Land, Forst, Guben and Spremberg.

== Coat of arms ==
District banner of Spree-Neiße

The coat of arms shows four fields each representing one of the previous districts. The crayfish in the topleft symbolizes Cottbus-Land, and is also present in the coat of arms of the city of Cottbus. The lion in the topright is the symbol of the Kingdom of Bohemia, as Spremberg was owned by the Bohemian kings. The deer antler in the bottomright symbolizes Forst, and was taken from the coat of arms of the Lords of Biberstein. The crown in the bottomleft represents the kings of Bohemia again, but this time symbolizing Guben.

== Towns and municipalities ==
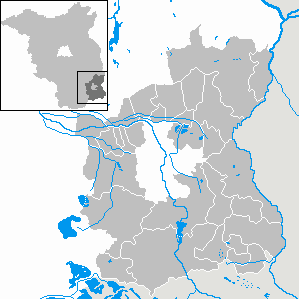
Clickable map of towns and municipalities in the district

Amt-free towns	Ämter
1. Drebkau – Drjowk; 2. Forst (Lausitz); 3. Guben; 4. Spremberg – Grodk; 5. Welzow – Wjelcej; Amt-free municipalities: 1. Kolkwitz – Gołkojce; 2. Neuhausen/Spree; 3. Schenkendöbern	1. Burg (Spreewald); 1. Briesen – Brjazyna; 2. Burg – Bórkowy^{1}; 3. Dissen-Striesow – Dešno-Strjažow; 4. Guhrow – Góry; 5. Schmogrow-Fehrow – Smogorjow-Prjawoz; 6. Werben – Wjerbno; 2. Döbern-Land; 1. Döbern^{1, 2}; 2. Felixsee; 3. Groß Schacksdorf-Simmersdorf; 4. Jämlitz-Klein Düben; 5. Neiße-Malxetal; 6. Tschernitz; 7. Wiesengrund – Łukojce	3. Peitz; 1. Drachhausen – Hochoza; 2. Drehnow – Drjenow; 3. Heinersbrück – Móst; 4. Jänschwalde – Janšojce; 5. Peitz – Picnjo^{1, 2}; 6. Tauer – Turjej; 7. Teichland – Gatojce; 8. Turnow-Preilack – Turnow-Pśiłuk
^{1}seat of the Amt; ^{2}town

== Demography ==
Development of Population since 1875 within the Current Boundaries (Blue Line: Population; Dotted Line: Comparison to Population Development of Brandenburg state)

Recent Population Development and Projections (Population Development before Census 2011 (blue line); Recent Population Development according to the Census in Germany in 2011 (blue bordered line); Official projections for 2005-2030 (yellow line); for 2014-2030 (red line); for 2017-2030 (scarlet line)

Landkreis Spree-Neiße: Population development
within the current boundaries (2025)

Year	Pop.	±% p.a.
1875	101,025	—
1890	113,766	+0.79%
1910	138,428	+0.99%
1925	144,789	+0.30%
1933	152,241	+0.63%
1939	156,827	+0.50%
1946	174,693	+1.55%
1950	174,606	−0.01%
1964	172,833	−0.07%
1971	169,325	−0.29%

Year	Pop.	±% p.a.
1981	165,870	−0.21%
1985	161,288	−0.70%
1990	154,926	−0.80%
1995	150,364	−0.60%
2000	148,700	−0.22%
2005	136,896	−1.64%
2010	126,400	−1.58%
2015	117,635	−1.43%
2020	113,011	−0.80%
2025	108,574	−0.80%
