= Schmogrow-Fehrow =

Schmogrow-Fehrow Smogorjow-Prjawoz
- Municipality
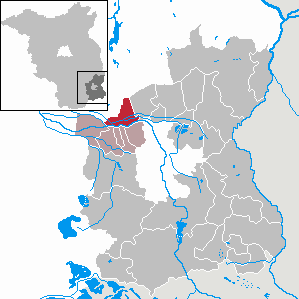
- Location of Schmogrow-Fehrow within Spree-Neiße district
- Interactive map of Schmogrow-Fehrow
- Location within Germany Location within Brandenburg
- Coordinates: 51°51′00″N 14°13′00″E
- Country: Germany
- State: Brandenburg
- District: Spree-Neiße
- Municipal assoc.: Burg (Spreewald)
- Subdivisions: 2 Ortsteile

Government
  - Mayor (2024–29): Ira Barbara Frackmann

Area
  - Total: 30.11 km^{2} (11.63 sq mi)
- Elevation: 55 m (180 ft)

Population (2025-12-31)
  - Total: 810
  - Density: 27/km^{2} (70/sq mi)
- Time zone: UTC+01:00 (CET)
  - Summer (DST): UTC+02:00 (CEST)
- Postal codes: 03096
- Dialling codes: 035603, 035606
- Vehicle registration: SPN
- Website: www.amt-burg-spreewald.de

Schmogrow-Fehrow (Lower Sorbian: Smogorjow-Prjawoz, pronounced [ˈsmɔɡɔrʲɔw ˈprʲawɔs]) is a municipality in the district of Spree-Neiße, in Lower Lusatia, Brandenburg, Germany.

== History ==
The municipality of Schmogrow-Fehrow was formed on 31 December 2001 by merging the municipalities of Schmogrow and Fehrow.

From 1815 to 1947, Schmogrow and Fehrow were part of the Prussian Province of Brandenburg.

After World War II, Schmogrow and Fehrow were incorporated into the State of Brandenburg from 1947 to 1952 and the Bezirk Cottbus of East Germany from 1952 to 1990. Since 1990, they have been part of Brandenburg, since 2001 united as the municipality of Schmogrow-Fehrow.

== Demography ==
Development of population since 1875 within the current boundaries (Blue line: Population; Dotted line: Comparison to population development of Brandenburg state; Grey background: Time of Nazi rule; Red background: Time of communist rule)

Schmogrow-Fehrow: Population development
within the current boundaries (2013)

Year	Pop.	±% p.a.
1875	1,190	—
1890	1,207	+0.09%
1910	1,062	−0.64%
1925	1,108	+0.28%
1933	1,040	−0.79%
1939	1,047	+0.11%
1946	1,319	+3.35%
1950	1,210	−2.13%
1964	1,036	−1.10%
1971	995	−0.58%
1981	850	−1.56%
1985	830	−0.59%
1989	898	+1.99%
1990	884	−1.56%
1991	896	+1.36%
1992	901	+0.56%
1993	898	−0.33%
1994	906	+0.89%
1995	921	+1.66%
1996	929	+0.87%

Year	Pop.	±% p.a.
1997	951	+2.37%
1998	943	−0.84%
1999	986	+4.56%
2000	982	−0.41%
2001	993	+1.12%
2002	1,008	+1.51%
2003	988	−1.98%
2004	979	−0.91%
2005	983	+0.41%
2006	959	−2.44%
2007	921	−3.96%
2008	885	−3.91%
2009	877	−0.90%
2010	867	−1.14%
2011	852	−1.73%
2012	844	−0.94%
2013	825	−2.25%
2014	814	−1.33%
2015	813	−0.12%
2016	792	−2.58%
