= Drebkau =

Drebkau Drjowk
- Town
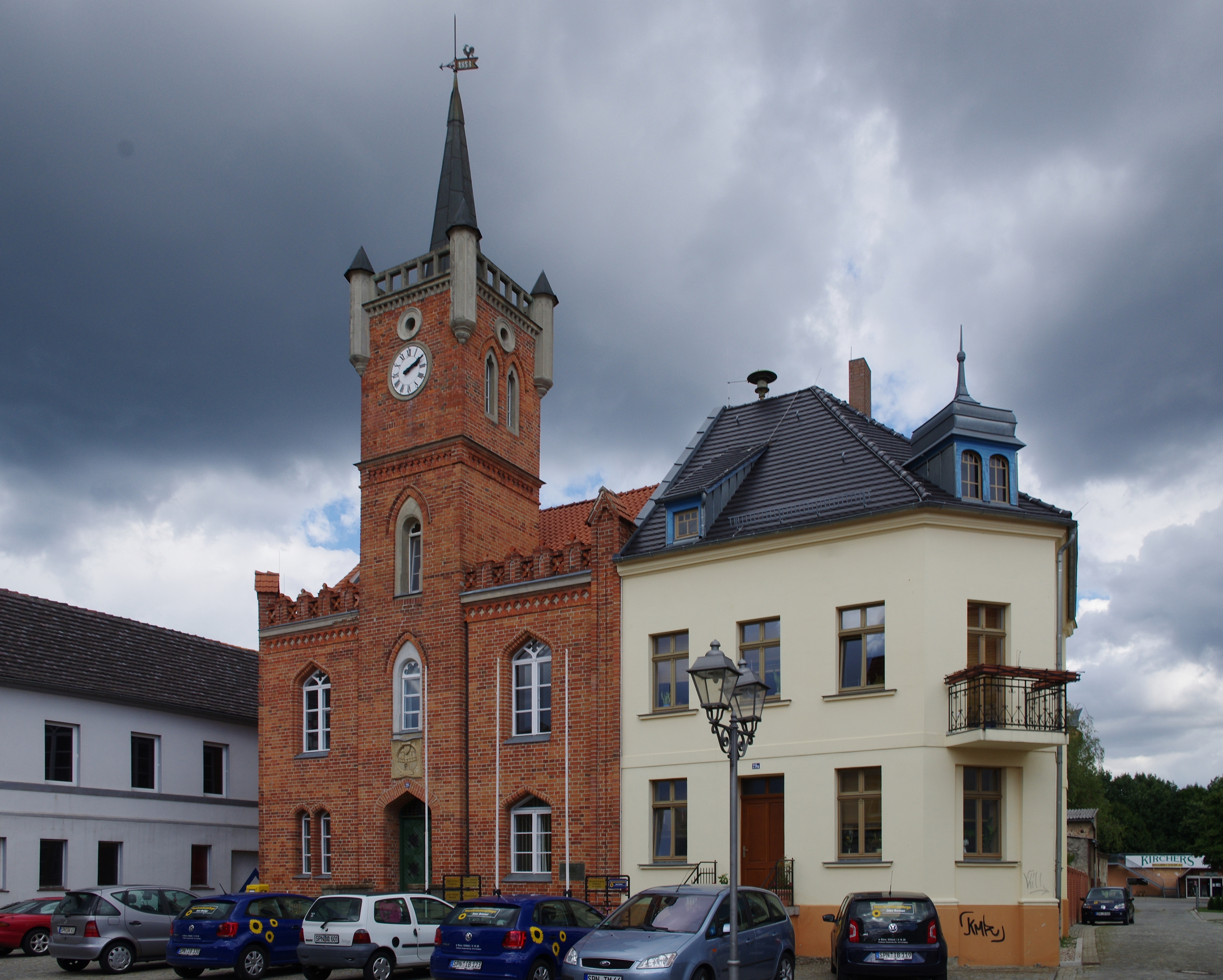
- Town hall

- Coat of arms

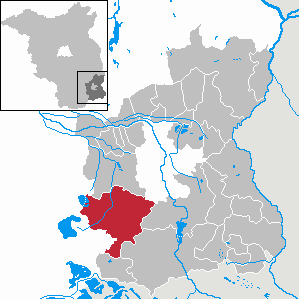
- Location of Drebkau within Spree-Neiße district
- Interactive map of Drebkau
- Location within Germany Location within Brandenburg
- Coordinates: 51°39′N 14°13′E
- Country: Germany
- State: Brandenburg
- District: Spree-Neiße
- Subdivisions: 10 Ortsteile

Government
  - Mayor (2018–26): Paul Köhne (CDU)

Area
  - Total: 143.91 km^{2} (55.56 sq mi)
- Elevation: 87 m (285 ft)

Population (2025-12-31)
  - Total: 5,388
  - Density: 37.44/km^{2} (96.97/sq mi)
- Time zone: UTC+01:00 (CET)
  - Summer (DST): UTC+02:00 (CEST)
- Postal codes: 03116
- Dialling codes: 035602
- Vehicle registration: SPN
- Website: www.drebkau.de

Drebkau (German pronunciation: [ˈdʁɛpkaʊ]; Lower Sorbian: Drjowk, pronounced [ˈdrʲɔwk]) is a town in the district of Spree-Neiße, in Lower Lusatia, in Brandenburg, in eastern Germany. It is situated 14 km (9 mi) southwest of Cottbus.

== History ==
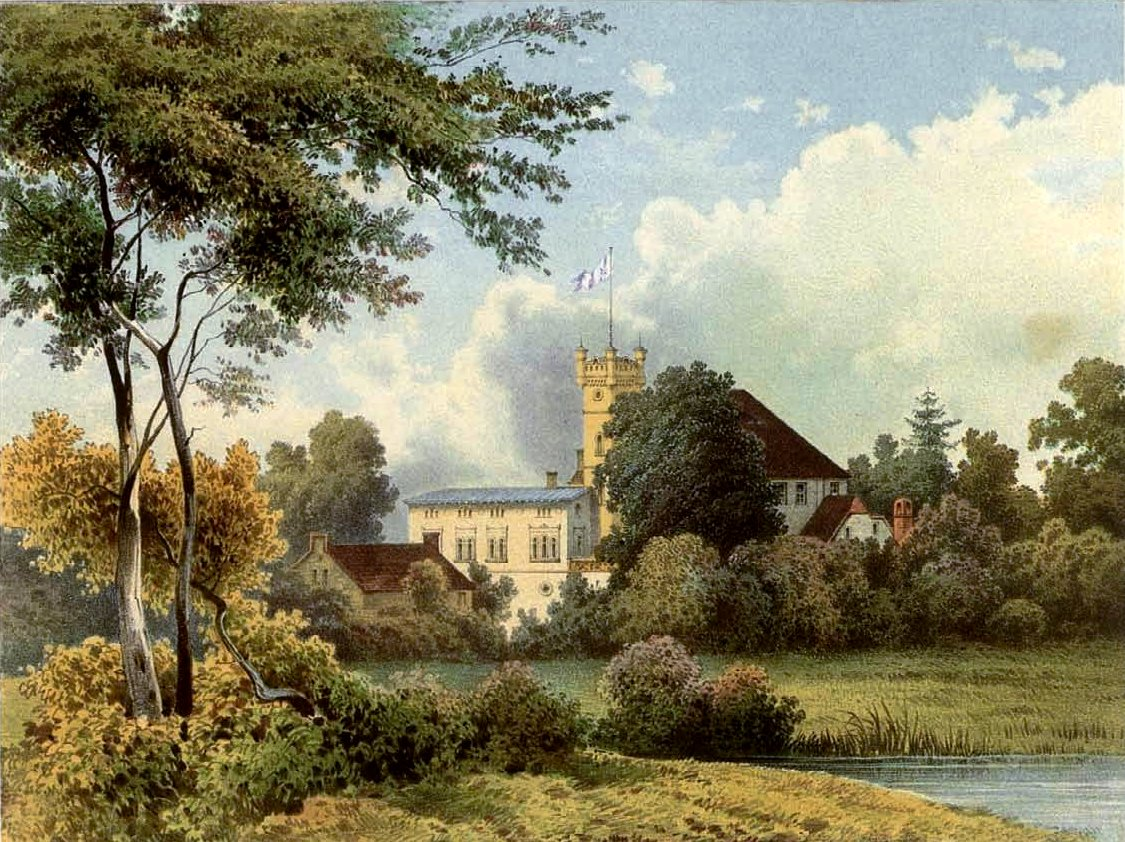
Palace in Drebkau, edition by Alexander Duncker

It was first mentioned in 1353. The town was at various times ruled by Bohemian, Hungarian, Saxon and monarchs, before it was became part of Prussia in 1815. The coat of arms contains the Czech Lion. From 1815 to 1947, Drebkau was part of the Province of Brandenburg.

During World War II, two forced labour subcamps of the Nazi prison for women in Cottbus were located in the present-day districts of Auras (Huraz) and Schorbus (Skjarbošc), respectively.

After the war, Drebkau was incorporated into the State of Brandenburg from 1947 to 1952 and the Bezirk Cottbus of East Germany from 1952 to 1990. Since 1990, Drebkau has been part of Brandenburg.

== Demography ==
Development of population since 1875 within the current Boundaries (Blue Line: Population; Dotted Line: Comparison to Population development in Brandenburg state; Grey Background: Time of Nazi Germany; Red Background: Time of communist East Germany)

Recent Population Development and Projections (Population Development before Census 2011 (blue line); Recent Population Development according to the Census in Germany in 2011 (blue bordered line); Official projections for 2005-2030 (yellow line); for 2017-2030 (scarlet line); for 2020-2030 (green line)

Drebkau: Population development
within the current boundaries (2020)

Year	Pop.	±% p.a.
1875	5,799	—
1890	5,453	−0.41%
1910	7,420	+1.55%
1925	7,771	+0.31%
1939	7,286	−0.46%
1950	9,311	+2.25%
1964	8,172	−0.93%

Year	Pop.	±% p.a.
1971	8,261	+0.15%
1981	6,937	−1.73%
1985	6,539	−1.47%
1990	6,068	−1.48%
1995	6,272	+0.66%
2000	6,628	+1.11%
2005	6,324	−0.93%

Year	Pop.	±% p.a.
2010	5,910	−1.34%
2015	5,626	−0.98%
2016	5,610	−0.28%
2017	5,580	−0.53%
2018	5,538	−0.75%
2019	5,509	−0.52%
2020	5,508	−0.02%

== Notable people ==
- Bogumił Šwjela (1873–1948), Sorbian Protestant clergyman, activist and journalist
