= Forst (Lausitz) =

Forst (Lausitz) Baršć (Łužyca)
- Town
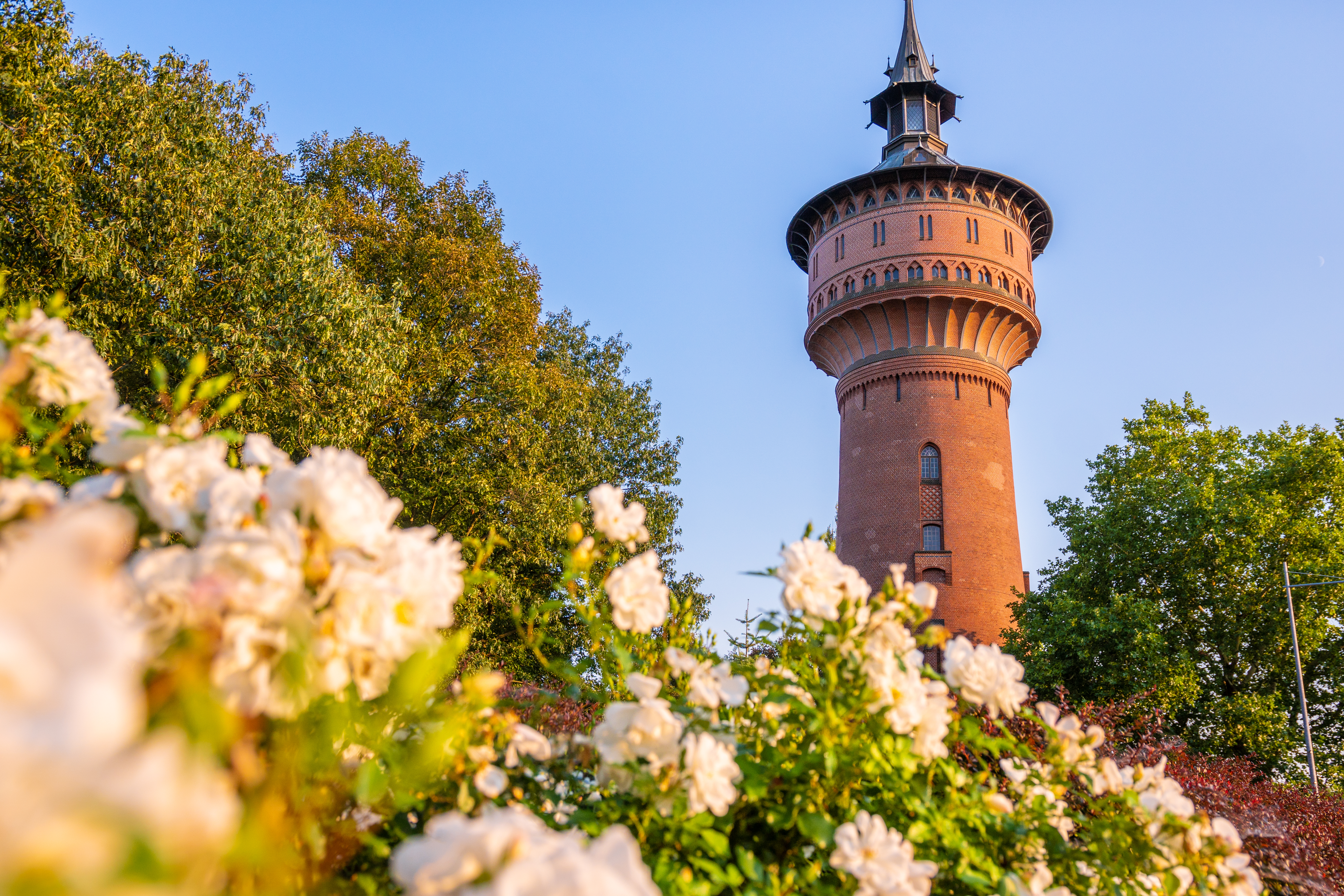
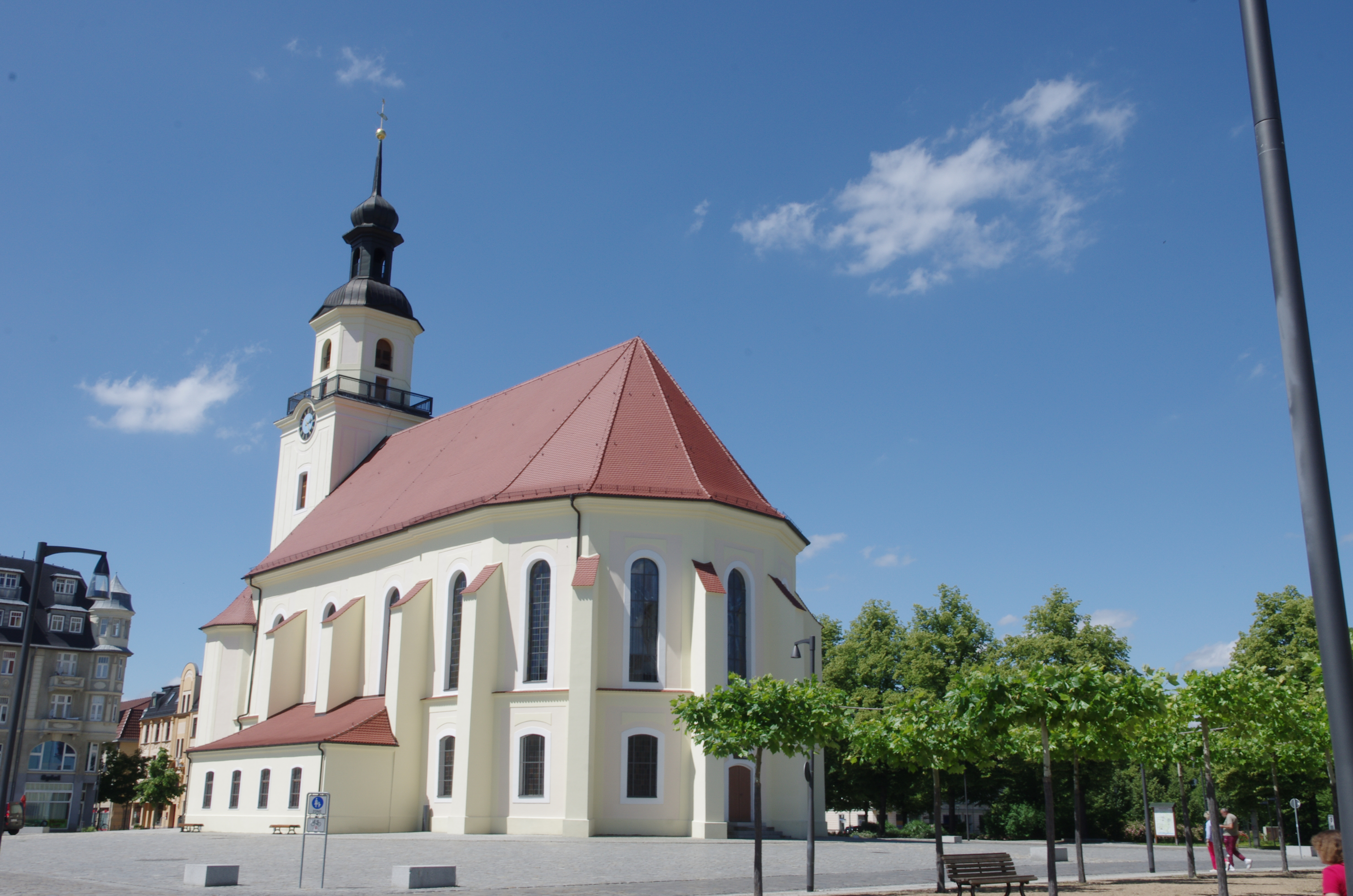
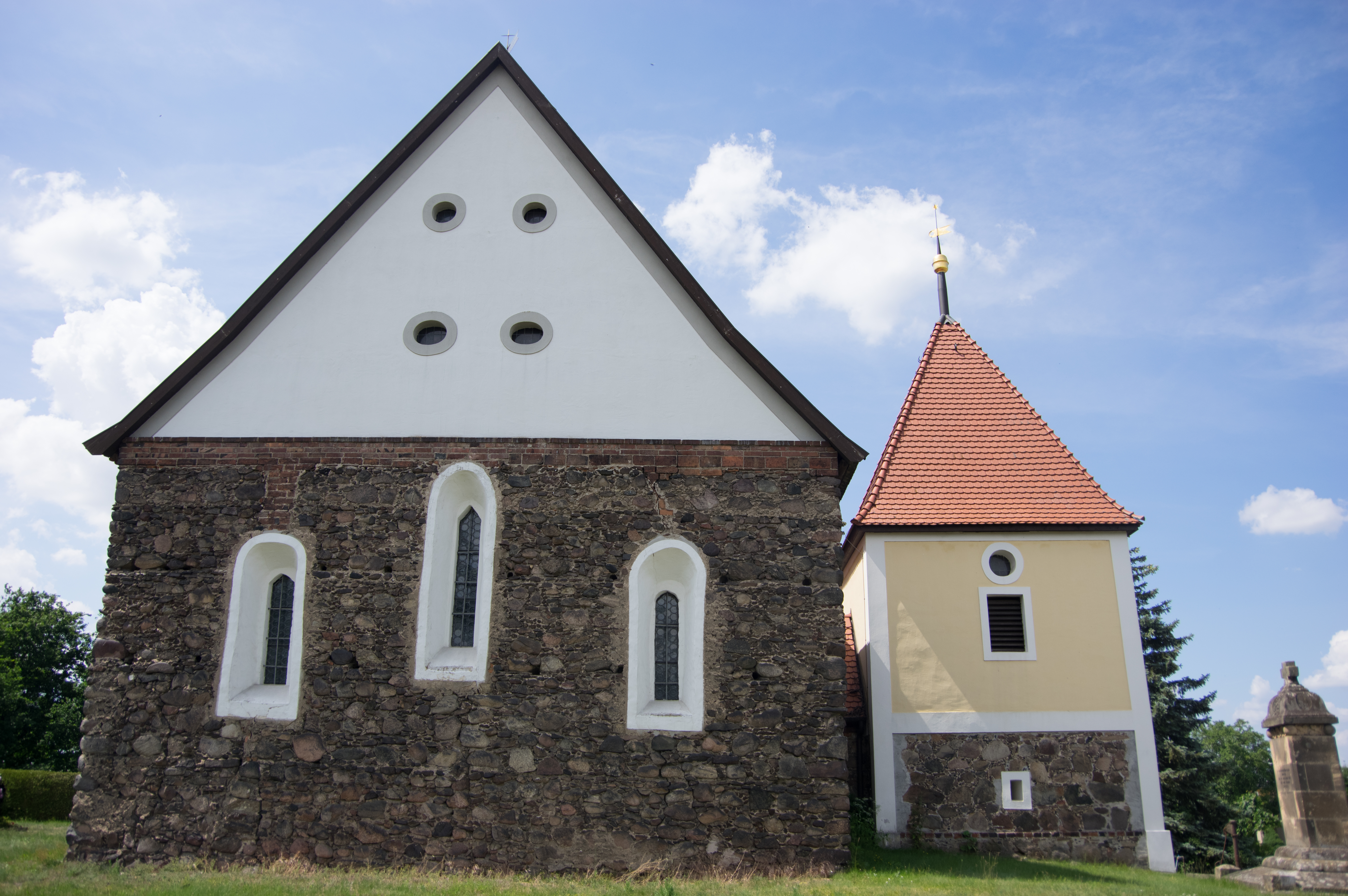
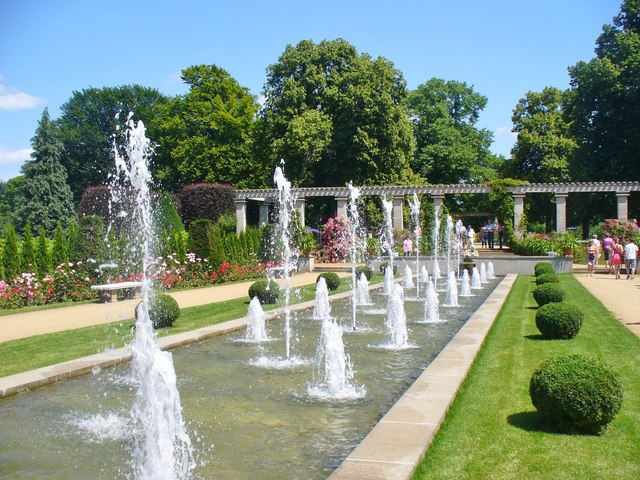
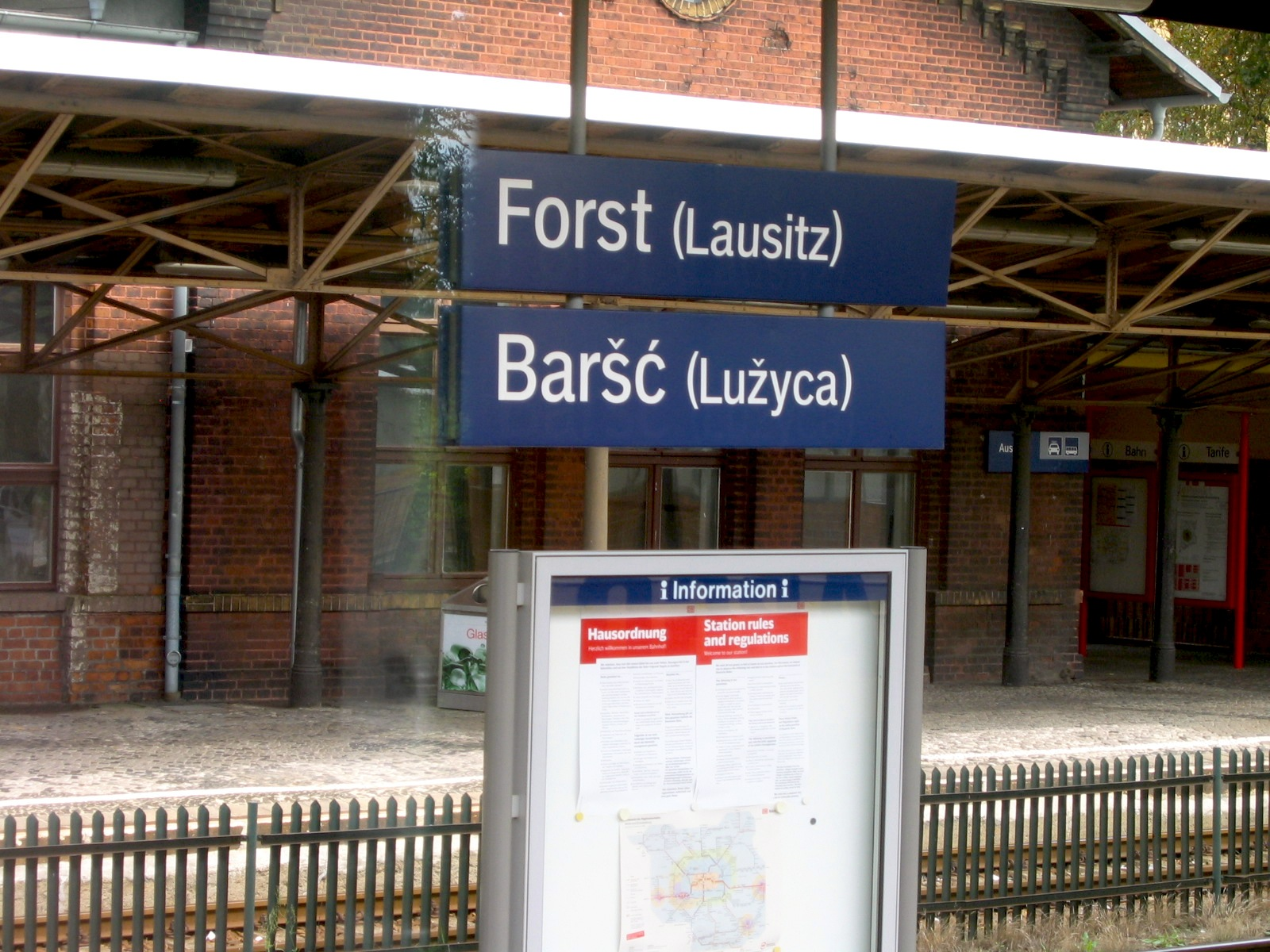
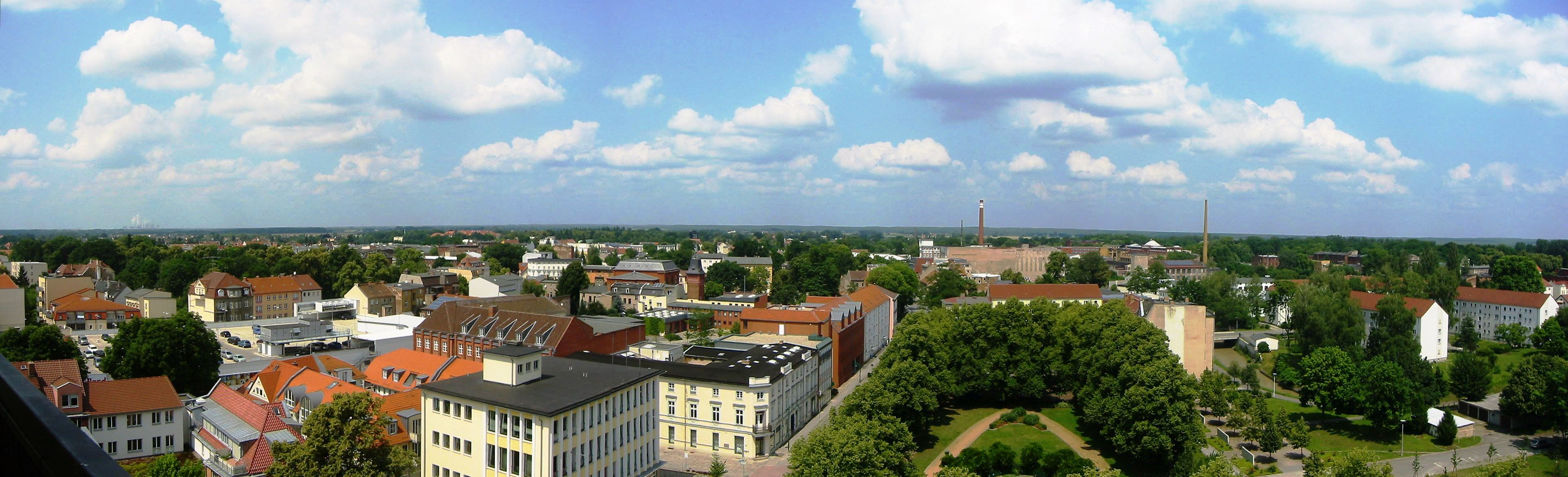
- From top: water tower St Nicholas' Church church in Naundorf (Glinsk); Ostdeutscher Rosengarten; Forst (Lausitz) station view from St Nicholas' Church

- Flag Coat of arms

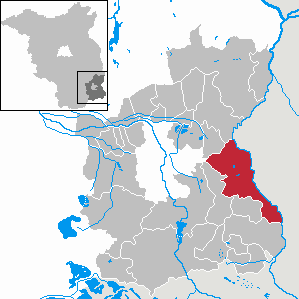
- Location of Forst (Lausitz); Baršć (Łužyca) within Spree-Neiße district
- Interactive map of Forst (Lausitz); Baršć (Łužyca)
- Location within Germany Location within Brandenburg
- Coordinates: 51°44′N 14°38′E
- Country: Germany
- State: Brandenburg
- District: Spree-Neiße

Government
  - Mayor (2018–26): Simone Taubenek

Area
  - Total: 110.7 km^{2} (42.7 sq mi)
- Elevation: 72 m (236 ft)

Population (2025-12-31)
  - Total: 16,933
  - Density: 153.0/km^{2} (396.2/sq mi)
- Time zone: UTC+01:00 (CET)
  - Summer (DST): UTC+02:00 (CEST)
- Postal codes: 03141–03149
- Dialling codes: 03562
- Vehicle registration: SPN
- Website: www.forst-lausitz.de

Forst (Lausitz) (German, pronounced [fɔʁst]) or Baršć (Łužyca) (Lower Sorbian, pronounced [ˈbarɕtɕ ˈwuʒɨtsa]) is a town in Lower Lusatia, Brandenburg, in eastern Germany. It lies east of Cottbus, on the Lusatian Neisse river which is also the German-Polish border. It is the capital of the Spree-Neiße district. It is known for its rose garden and textile museum. The town's population is 18,651. In Forst, there is a railway bridge across the Neiße belonging to the line Cottbus–Żary which is serviced by regional trains and a EuroCity train between Hamburg and Kraków (2011). There is also a road bridge across the river north of Forst.

== Incorporated villages ==
- Forst (Lausitz) – Baršć (Łužyca)
  - Domsdorf – Domašojce
  - Eigene Scholle – Swójske Grunty
  - Eulo – Wiłow
  - Försterei Keune – Gólnikaŕnja Chójna
  - Keune – Chójna
  - Mexiko
  - Noßdorf – Nosydłojce
- Bohrau – Bórow
- Briesnig – Rjasnik
- Groß Bademeusel – Wjelike Bóžemysle
- Groß Jamno – Jamne
- Horno – Rogow
- Klein Bademeusel – Małe Bóžemysle
  - Försterei Bademeusel – Bóžemyslańska Gólnikaŕnja
- Klein Jamno – Małe Jamne
- Mulknitz – Małksa
- Naundorf – Glinsk
  - Neu Sacro – Nowy Zakrjow
- Sacro – Zakrjow

== History ==
A short distance to the south of the old Sorbian village of Altforst, the town probably originated around 1150 at a river crossing point on the important west–east trade route. Known as the "Salt Road", it was used to transport salt from Halle to Lusatia and further east to Poland. By 1265 it was developing into a permanent trading settlement round the Church of St Nicholas. The commercial importance of Forst increased with the development of a north–south route connecting to Guben, downstream along the Neisse River. In the fourteenth century the council was able to take on responsibility for the lower courts locally. In 1352 of Ileburg took over the overlordship of Forst from Frederick III of Meissen. At various times the town was under the suzerainty of Bohemian, Hungarian, Saxon and Polish monarchs. In 1628, clothiers from Leszno, Międzyrzecz and Wschowa in Poland settled in the town. In 1746, it was purchased by Heinrich von Brühl, minister of Augustus III of Poland. In 1749, a new postal route was established from Warsaw and Poznań to Dresden, which led through the town.

Forst was awarded to the Kingdom of Prussia in the 1815 Congress of Vienna. The town was administered as a part of the Province of Brandenburg from 1815 to 1947. During World War II, in 1942–1943, the Germans operated a forced labour camp for Jewish men in the town. After the war it became part of the State of Brandenburg, which became one of the constituent parts of the German Democratic Republic in 1949. From 1952 to 1990, it was part of the East German Bezirk Cottbus. Since German reunification in 1990, it is again part of Brandenburg.

Forst has experienced severe problems as a result of the 1990 German reunification, most notably from extreme unemployment. In the past, the town was known for textile manufacturing, but all of the textile plants and factories have closed down.

== Demography ==
Development of population since 1875 within the current Boundaries (Blue Line: Population; Dotted Line: Comparison to Population development in Brandenburg state; Grey Background: Time of Nazi Germany; Red Background: Time of communist East Germany)

Recent Population Development and Projections (Population Development before Census 2011 (blue line); Recent Population Development according to the Census in Germany in 2011 (blue bordered line); Official projections for 2005-2030 (yellow line); for 2017-2030 (scarlet line); for 2020-2030 (green line)

Forst (Lausitz): Population development
within the current boundaries (2020)

Year	Pop.	±% p.a.
1875	19,084	—
1890	27,494	+2.46%
1910	31,594	+0.70%
1925	32,977	+0.29%
1939	36,771	+0.78%
1950	33,339	−0.89%
1964	32,342	−0.22%

Year	Pop.	±% p.a.
1971	31,471	−0.39%
1981	28,870	−0.86%
1985	28,031	−0.73%
1990	27,214	−0.59%
1995	25,701	−1.14%
2000	24,309	−1.11%
2005	22,391	−1.63%

Year	Pop.	±% p.a.
2010	20,618	−1.64%
2015	18,773	−1.86%
2016	18,651	−0.65%
2017	18,353	−1.60%
2018	18,164	−1.03%
2019	17,902	−1.44%
2020	17,691	−1.18%

== Notable people ==
- Hugo Baum (1867–1950), botanist
- Georg Thomas (1890–1946), general of infantry
- Bruno Kastner (1890–1932), film and stage actor
- Max Seydewitz (1892–1987), politician (SPD, SED)
- Brigitte Frank, née Herbst (1895–1959), wife of Hans Frank
- Erich Neumann (1892–1948), politician (NSDAP)
- Werner Heyde (1902–1964), psychiatrist, involved in the T 4 program
- Georg Bose (1921–2011), German officer during World War II
- Günter Nooke (born 1959), politician (CDU)
- Dietmar Woidke (born 1961), politician (SPD)
- René Rydlewicz (born 1973), footballer
- Ronny Scholz (born 1978), cyclist

== See also ==
- Bohrau
