= Golßener Land =

German municipality

Coordinates: 51.967°N 13.583°E

Amt Golßener Land is a former Amt ("collective municipality") in the district of Dahme-Spreewald, in Brandenburg, Germany. Its seat was in the town Golßen. It merged into the Amt Unterspreewald on 1 January 2013.

The Amt Golßener Land consisted of the following municipalities:

- Drahnsdorf
- Golßen
- Kasel-Golzig
- Steinreich

== Demography ==
Development of Population since 1875 within the Current Boundaries (Blue Line: Population; Dotted Line: Comparison to Population Development of Brandenburg state; Grey Background: Time of Nazi rule; Red Background: Time of Communist rule)

Recent Population Development (Blue Line) and Forecasts
