= Krausnick =

- Ortsteil of Krausnick-Groß Wasserburg
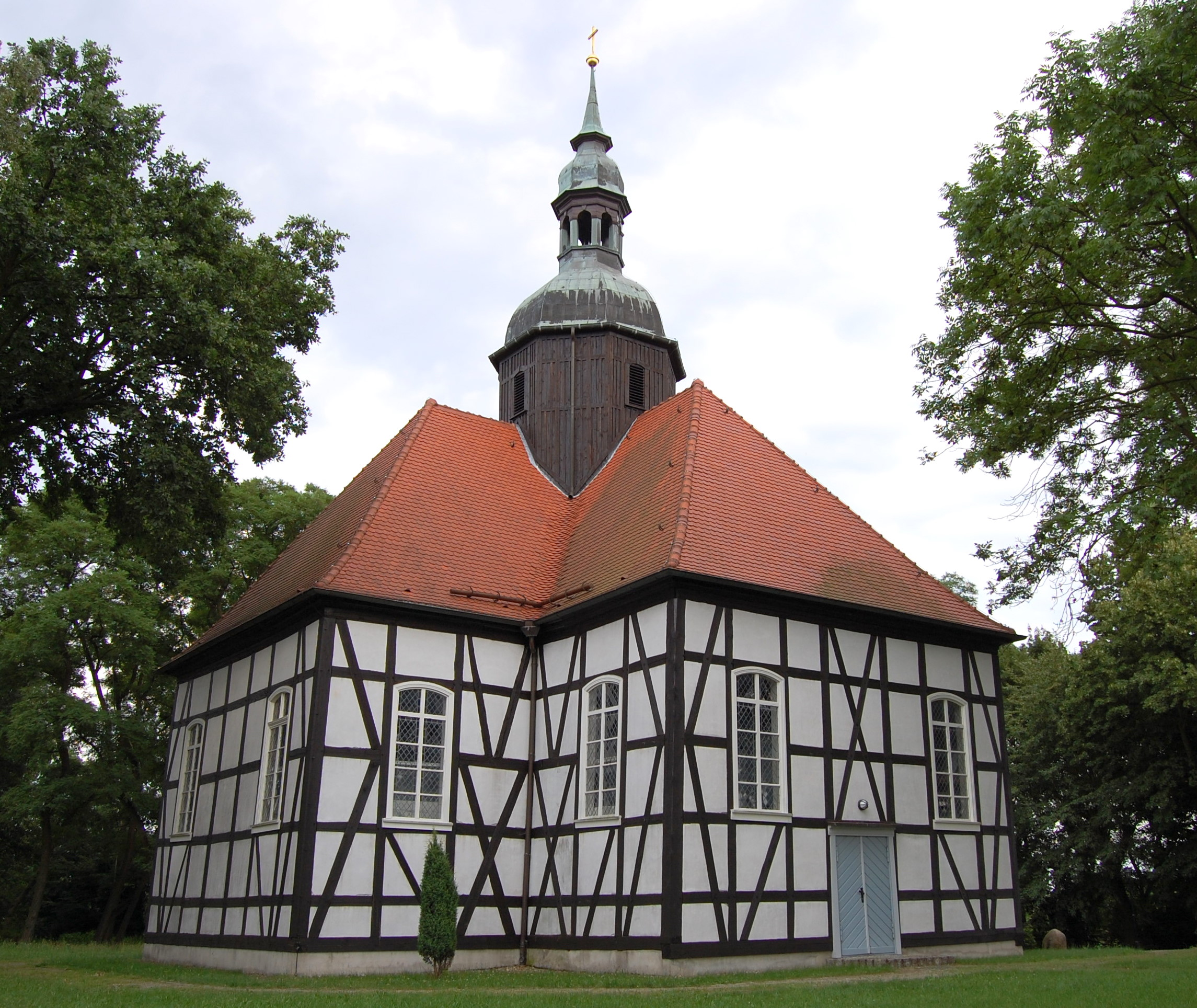
- Church in Krausnick
- Interactive map of Krausnick
- Location within Germany Location within Brandenburg
- Coordinates: 52°1′54″N 13°49′45″E
- Country: Germany
- State: Brandenburg
- District: Dahme-Spreewald
- Municipal assoc.: Unterspreewald
- Municipality: Krausnick-Groß Wasserburg

Area
  - Total: 34.53 km^{2} (13.33 sq mi)
- Elevation: 51 m (167 ft)

Population (2017)
  - Total: 413
  - Density: 12.0/km^{2} (31.0/sq mi)
- Time zone: UTC+01:00 (CET)
  - Summer (DST): UTC+02:00 (CEST)
- Postal codes: 15910
- Dialling codes: 035472, 035477
- Vehicle registration: LDS, KW, LC, LN

Krausnick (Lower Sorbian: Kšušwica) is a village in the Dahme-Spreewald district of Brandenburg, Germany. It is located in Lower Lusatia, about 60 km (38 mi) south of Berlin. Krausnick is most famous for the theme park Tropical Islands Resort which is located near the village and the Krausnick hills. Since 31 December 2001, Krausnick is part of the municipality Krausnick-Groß Wasserburg.

== History ==
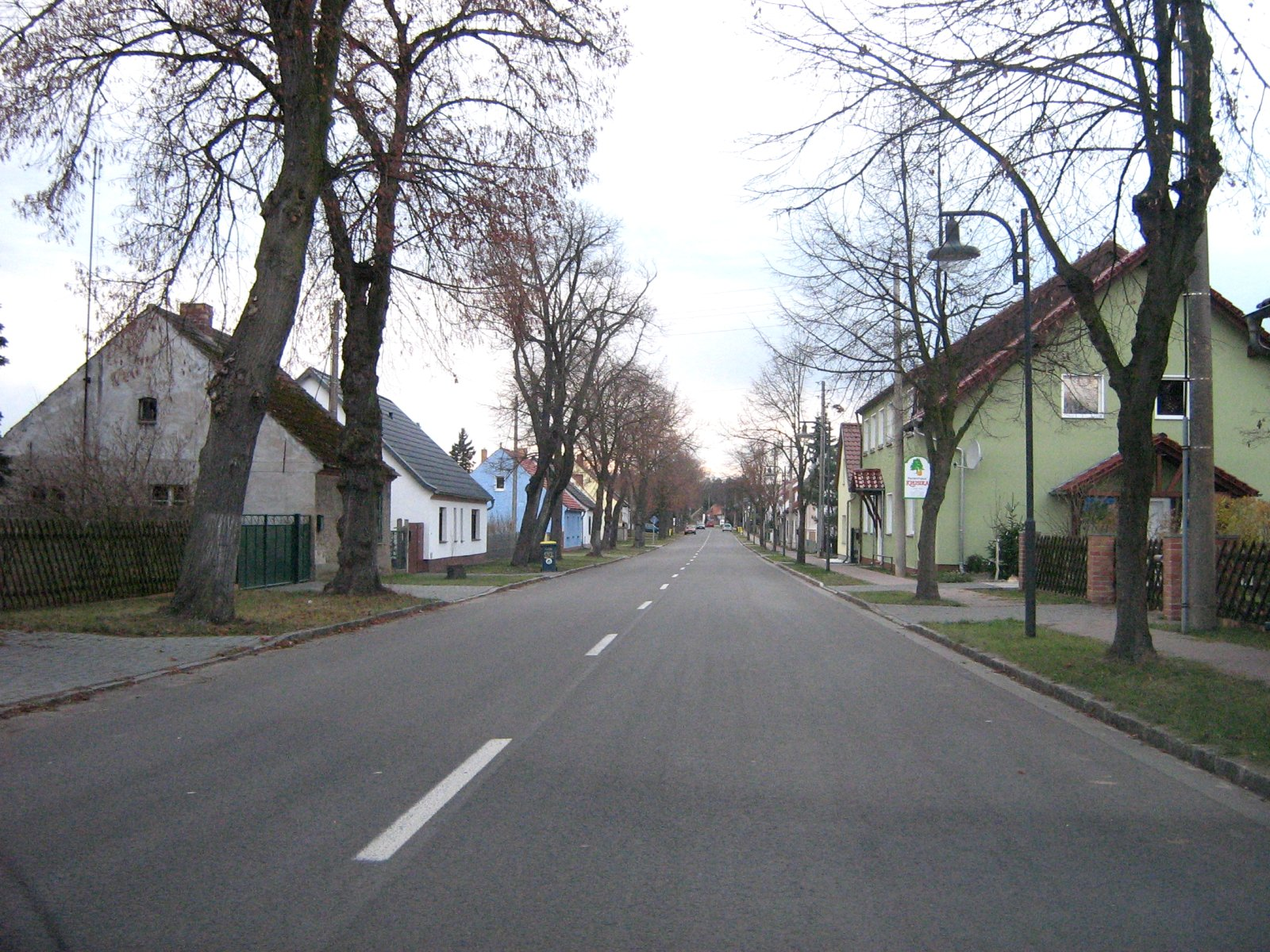
Village center

Krausnick was first mentioned in 1376 as Krusenigk. The village's name derives from the Sorbian term for Pyrus communis, a kind of tree in the area. During the Thirty Years' War, Krausnick was attacked and burnt down several times. The village was rebuilt and in 1728 the erection of the Krausnick Lutheran church began. At first, the church was a filial church of Buchholz until Krausnick became a church by itself in the 19th century. After Krausnick became part of the German Democratic Republic, the village farmers organized themselves in a so-called Landwirtschaftlichen Produktionsgenossenschaft, which merged with the LPG of neighboring Leibsch in 1976 and was dissolved after the German reunification.

On 6 December 1993, the municipality of Krausnick became part of the Dahme-Spreewald district, prior to belonging to the dissolved Lübben district. On 31 December 2001, Krausnick and Groß Wasserburg merged into the new municipality of Krausnick-Groß Wasserburg, which is part of Amt Unterspreewald.

== Demographics ==
Krausnick: Population development
within the former municipality boundaries (2000)

Year	Pop.	±% p.a.
1875	871	—
1890	798	−0.58%
1910	646	−1.05%
1925	702	+0.56%
1933	680	−0.40%
1939	723	+1.03%
1946	927	+3.61%
1950	815	−3.17%

Year	Pop.	±% p.a.
1964	639	−1.72%
1971	591	−1.11%
1981	522	−1.23%
1985	481	−2.02%
1989	483	+0.10%
1990	466	−3.52%
1991	439	−5.79%
1992	430	−2.05%

Year	Pop.	±% p.a.
1993	430	+0.00%
1994	429	−0.23%
1995	428	−0.23%
1996	435	+1.64%
1997	430	−1.15%
1998	427	−0.70%
1999	448	+4.92%
2000	416	−7.14%
