= Dahme Flood Relief Canal =

Canal in Brandenburg, Germany

Coordinates: 52°04′59″N 13°49′05″E

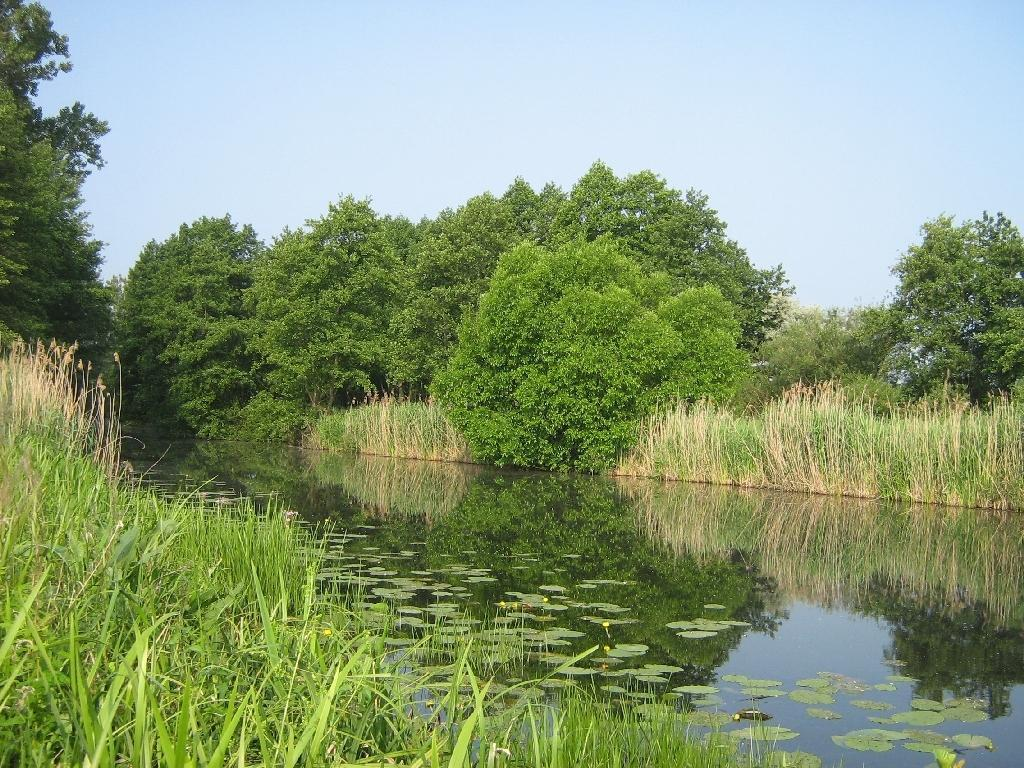
The Dahme Flood Relief Canal

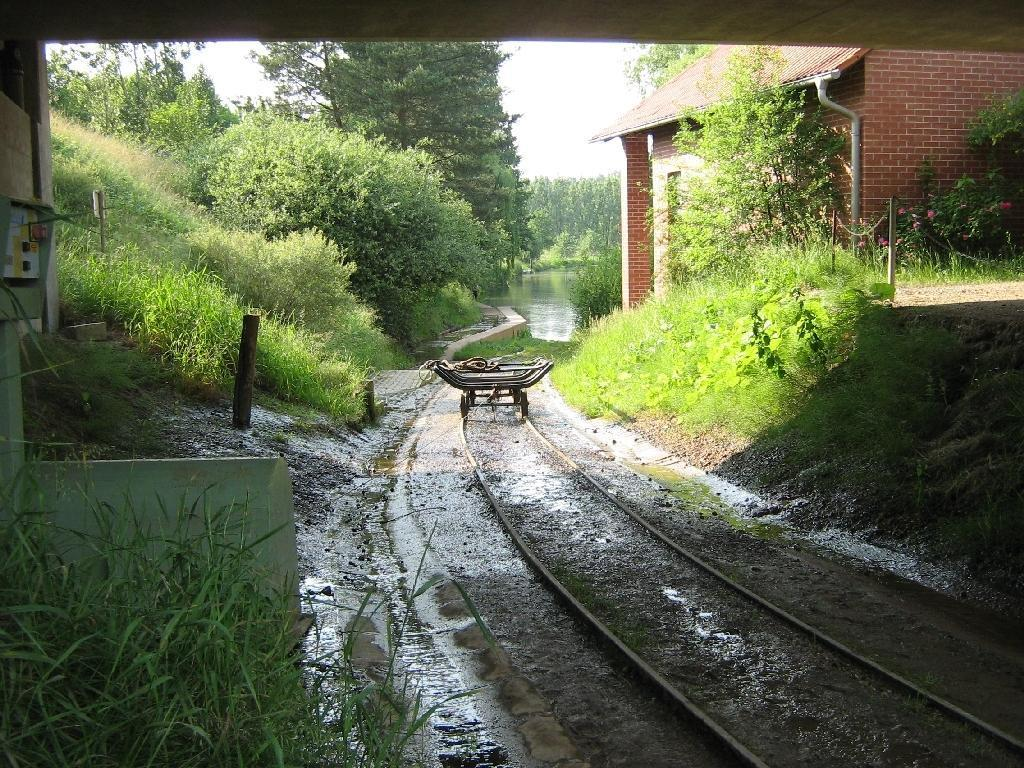
Inclined plane in the weir at Märkisch Buchholz

The Dahme Flood Relief Canal, or Dahme-Umflutkanal in German, is a canal in the German state of Brandenburg. Its principal purpose is to divert water from the upper reaches of the River Spree just below Leibsch, to run into the River Dahme at Märkisch Buchholz.

The canal is entered from the River Spree by a lock and is navigable downstream to Märkisch Buchholz. A weir here prevents direct access to the River Dahme, but a small inclined plane allows canoes and small craft to by-pass the weir near Märkisch Buchholz.

The canal is 9.5 kilometres (5.9 mi) in length, and at about its midpoint crosses the Köthener See. The Umflut Canal opens up the nearly 200 km long Märkische Runde with the two aforementioned boat slips, clockwise via Dahme, Oder-Spree Canal, Neuendorf (and other) waters, as well as 12 locks.
