= Krausnick (disambiguation) =

Krausnick may refer to:

== Places ==
- Krausnick, a village in the Dahme-Spreewald district of Brandenburg, Germany.
- Krausnick hills, a small range of hills near Krausnick.

== Surname ==
- Helmut Krausnick (1905–1990), German historian and writer.
- Heinrich Wilhelm Krausnick (1797–1882), German lawyer and Lord Mayor of Berlin.
