= Spreewald gherkins =

Specialty gherkin from Brandenburg

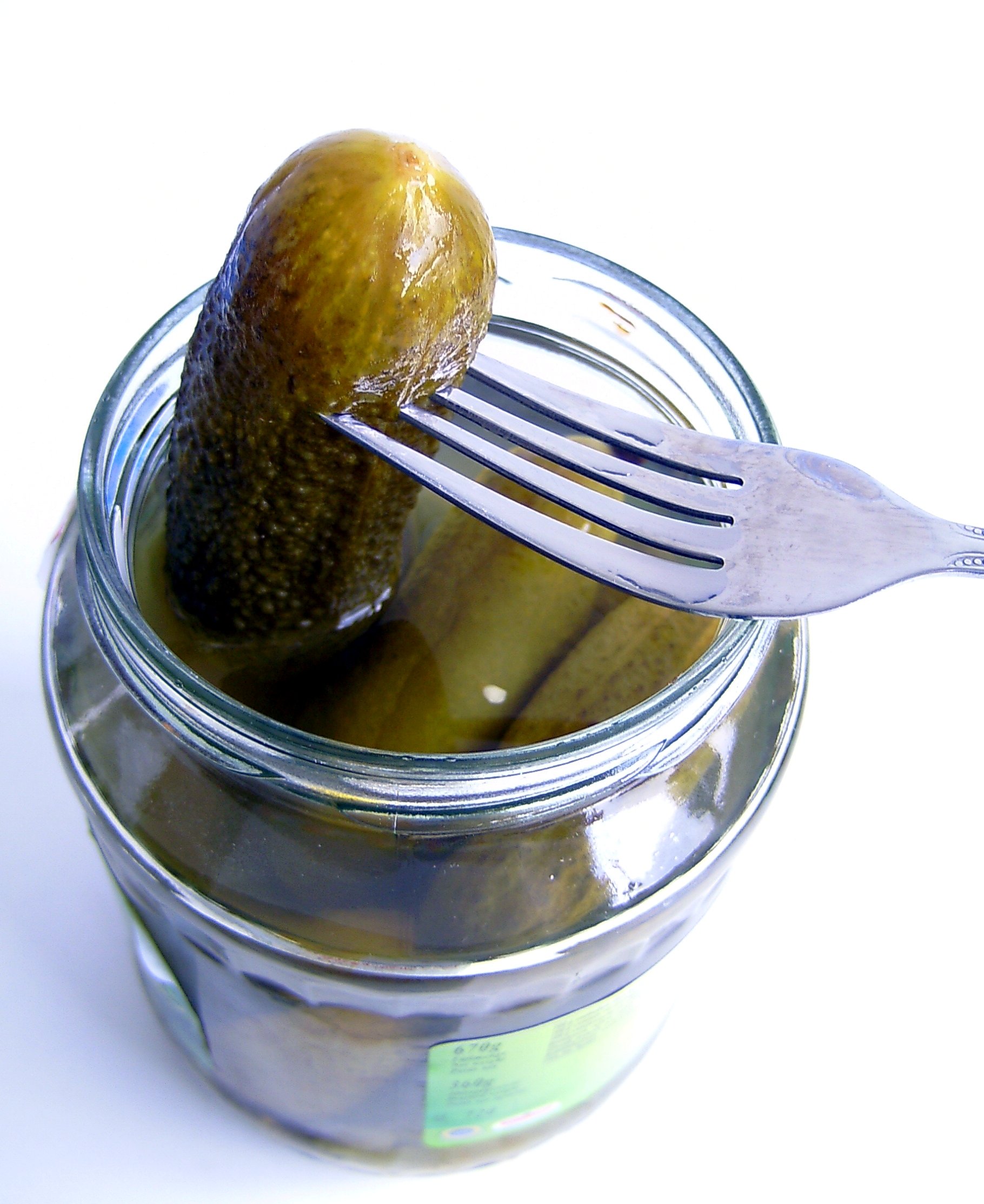
- Spreewald gherkins with garlic
- Type: Pickled cucumber
- Region or state: Spreewald, Brandenburg

Spreewald gherkins (German: Spreewälder Gurken or Spreewaldgurken) are a specialty pickled cucumber from Brandenburg, which are protected by the EU as a Protected Geographical Indication (PGI).

== Overview ==
In the 1870s, Theodor Fontane found that the Spreewaldgurke stood at the top of the agricultural products in Brandenburg's Spreewald:

The products of the Spreewald have their most superb trading center in Lübbenau and go from here out into the world. Among these products, the cucumbers are at the top. In a previous year, a single merchant sold 800 Schock [48,000] per week. That would mean nothing in Hamburg or Liverpool, where one is used to reckoning by loads and tons, but every 'place has its measure', which amounts to a good reputation, considering these 800 Schock. Incidentally, Lübbenau does not lag behind by selling an article which could perhaps invite ridicule, cucumbers and horse radish are of equal birth...

— Theodore Fontane, Wanderungen durch die Mark Brandenburg (1882)

The secret of the Spreewald gherkins' special taste remained hidden, even to the satirist Fontane. Certainly, the moist soil, rich in humus, and the climate in the Spreewald also contribute to the good growth in the cucumber fields. The actual reason for the taste, which is considered by connoisseurs to be delicate, is found in their processing. While the process of fermentation in large barrels formerly took several weeks, gherkins today are ready for sale after only one day of processing—whether for mustard gherkins (Senfgurke), gherkins or dill pickles (Gewürzgurke) or pickled cucumbers (Salzgurke). This enormous time saving is achieved by heating to 70 °C (158 °F) with the addition of caustic soda. The composition of the additional ingredients, however, still remains a well-guarded secret of the approximately twenty picklers. These taste-enhancing ingredients, such as basil, lemon balm, grape leaves, cherry leaves or walnut leaves, give Spreewald gherkins their special sour, spicy taste.

After the reunification of Germany in 1990, Spreewald gherkins were one of the few products from East Germany which were still available without interruption. The gherkins also achieved fame in 2003 with the award-winning film Good Bye Lenin! by Wolfgang Becker. In this tragicomedy, Daniel Brühl has great difficulty obtaining the Spreewald gherkins that his sick mother (Katrin Sass) dearly loved and which he absolutely needed to convince her of the continued existence of the (in his view) "ideal East German world".

Meanwhile, the gherkins can again be obtained under their trademarked name Spreewälder Gurken, which is a Protected Geographical Indication (PGI) in the EU as of March 1999. In 2004, 50 businesses in the region announced their voluntary commitment to declare the Spreewald to be a genetic-engineering-free region.

== Gherkin locations and the Gurkenradweg ==
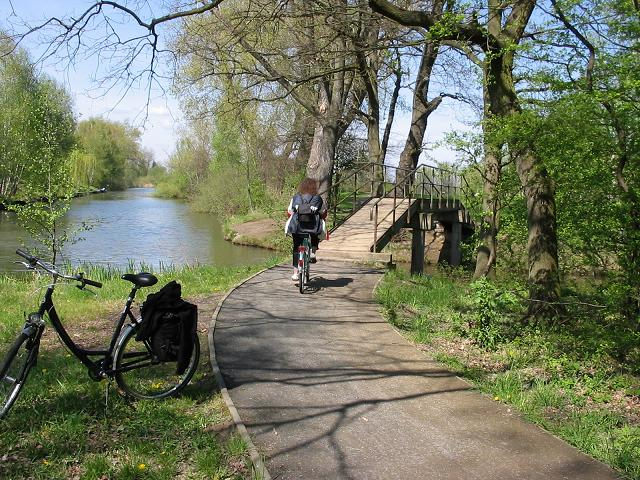
The Gurken-Radweg (Gherkin Bicycle Path)

There are cucumber fields in all of the Spreewald, the largest part of which has been specially protected as the Biosphärenreservat Spreewald (Spreewald Biosphere Reserve) since 1990. The following locations have special offerings on and around the gherkin:

- Golßen. Spreewaldkonserve Golßen - Tour of a gherkin production site
- Leipe. Traditional vegetable growing
- Lehde. Farmhouse and gherkin museum
- Schlepzig. Agricultural history museum
- Lübbenau/Spreewald. Spreewaldmuseum

The Gurken-Radweg (Gherkin Bicycle Path) is named in honor of the gherkin, because of its services. The logo of the tour shows a smiling gherkin on a bicycle.

At the annual Spreewald-Marathon, which is held in the disciplines of running, bicycling, hiking, canoeing, and skating, the competition is started with, "Auf die Gurke, fertig, los" (On the gherkin, steady, go!) instead of "Auf die Plätze, fertig, los" (ready, steady, go!).

== Sources ==
- Theodor Fontane, Wanderungen durch die Mark Brandenburg Volume 4. Spreeland. Cited from the 1998 edition, Frankfurt am Main, Berlin.
