= Köthener See =

Lake in Dahme-Spreewald District, Brandenburg, Germany

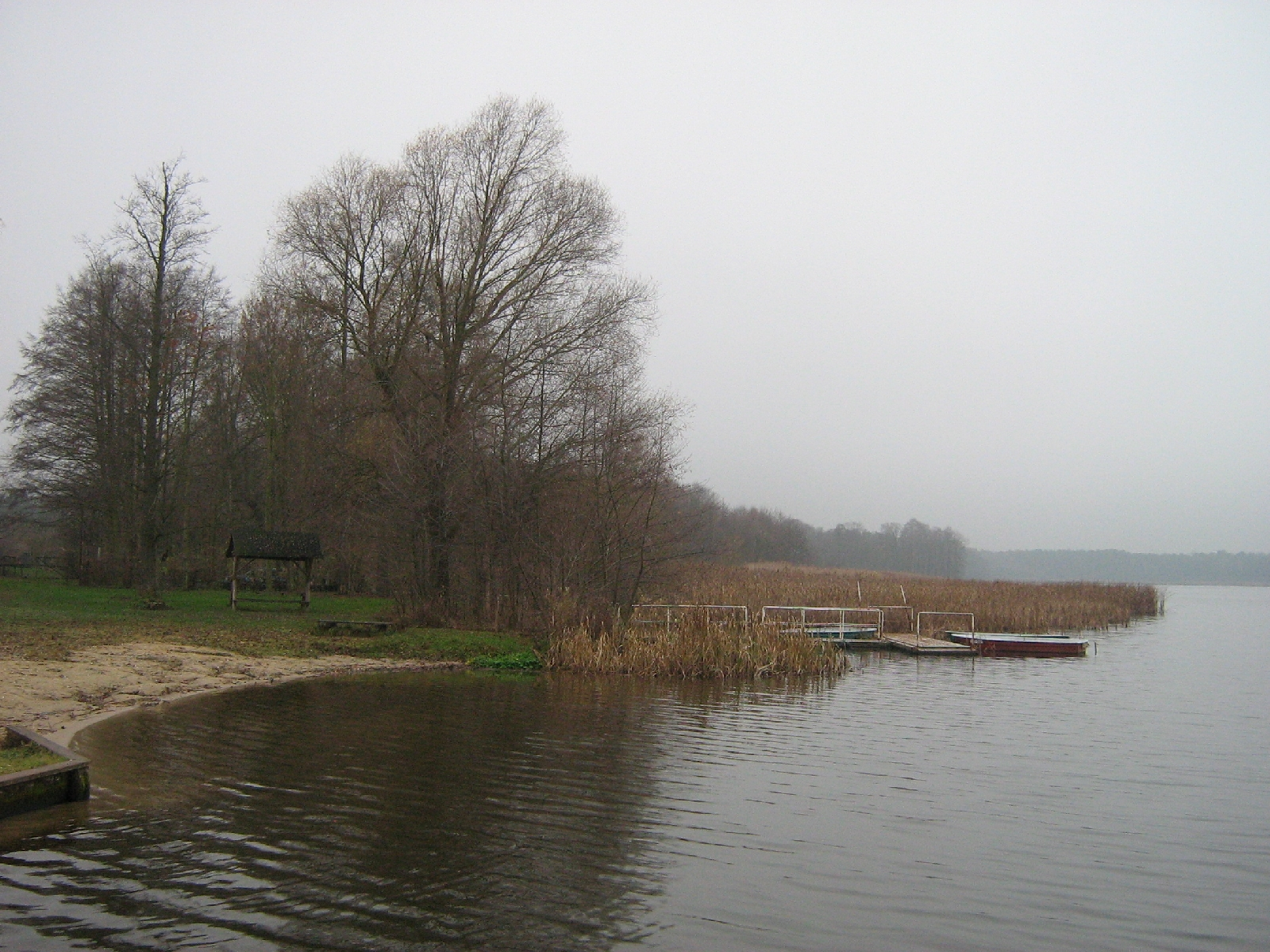

- Location within Brandenburg
- Location: Landkreis Dahme-Spreewald, Brandenburg
- Coordinates: 52°4′49.5″N 13°48′43.0″E
- Primary inflows: Randkanal (Wasserburger Spree), Dahme-Umflutkanal
- Primary outflows: Dahme-Umflutkanal
- Basin countries: Germany
- Max. length: 2,250 m (7,380 ft)
- Max. width: 1 km (0.62 mi)
- Surface area: 1.48 km^{2} (0.57 sq mi)
- Max. depth: 2.0 m (6 ft 7 in)
- Surface elevation: 43 m (141 ft)

Köthener See is a lake in Landkreis Dahme-Spreewald, Brandenburg, Germany. It lies at an elevation of 43 m, and has a surface area of 1.48 km². It is located in the municipality of Märkisch Buchholz, Dahme-Spreewald district.
