= Solms-Baruth =

Former monarchy in Europe

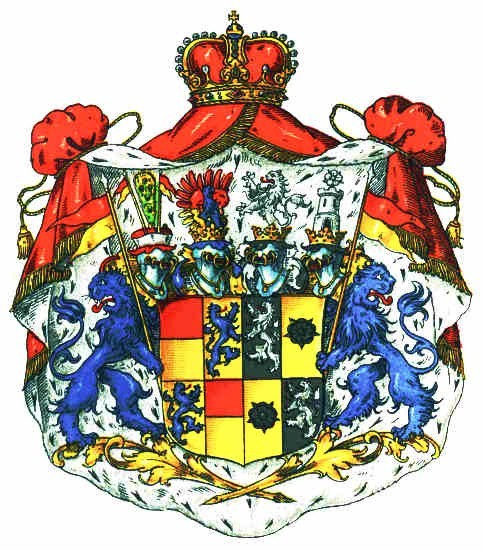
Coat of arms of the Prince of Solms-Baruth (1888)

Solms-Baruth was a Lower Lusatian state country, from the 16th century until 1945, ruled by the Baruth branch of the House of Solms.

== History ==
The House of Solms had its origins at Solms, Hesse, and ruled several of the many minor states of the Holy Roman Empire. These lost their independence in the German Mediatization of 1806.

Later the Baruth branch also purchased the estates of Golßen and Casel in the March of Lusatia and, in 1767, Kliczków Castle (Klitschdorf) in Silesia which became their main seat. They owned Baruth and the other estates from 1615 to 1945 (when they were expropriated in communist East Germany), including the manor houses, ten villages and about 15,000 hectares of agriculture and forestry land.

In 1635, the March passed from the Kingdom of Bohemia to the Electorate of Saxony which in 1806 became the Kingdom of Saxony, with the counts of Solms-Baruth occupying a hereditary seat in the Saxonian Landtag. In 1815, when Saxony was punished at the Congress of Vienna for its loyalty to Napoleon by the confiscation of a significant part of its territory, the March of Lusatia, including Solms-Baruth, was transferred to the Kingdom of Prussia.

The Prussian representative at the Congress was Prince Karl August von Hardenberg and his assistant, Count Wilhelm of Solms-Sonnewalde (1787-1859). The Counts of Solms-Baruth were granted a seat in the Prussian House of Lords, until the German Revolution of 1918–1919. Count Friedrich zu Solms-Baruth (1821–1904) was elevated to the hereditary rank of a Fürst (Prince) by the King of Prussia in 1888. Prince Friedrich zu Solms-Baruth (1886–1951) was not a member of the Kreisau Circle, dissidents who opposed Hitler's Nazi regime.

== Properties ==
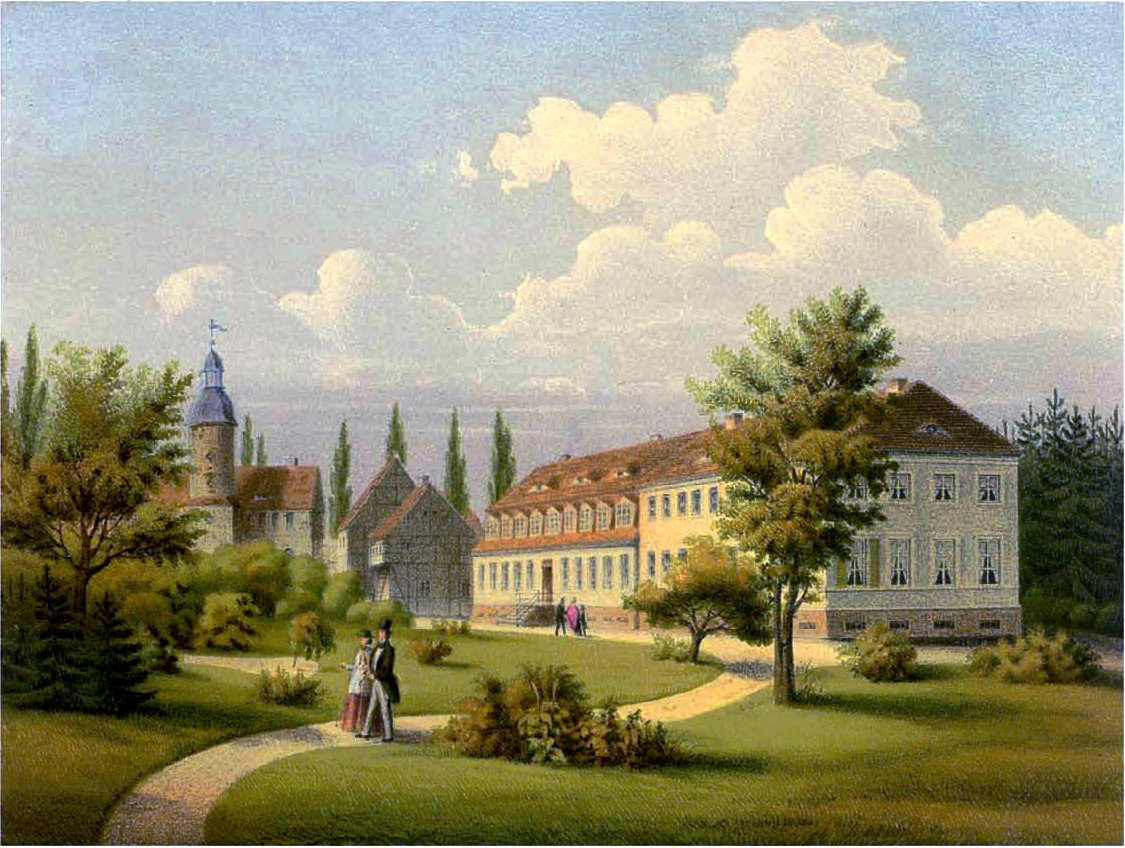
Baruth Castle in the 19th century, seat of the Solms-Baruth family

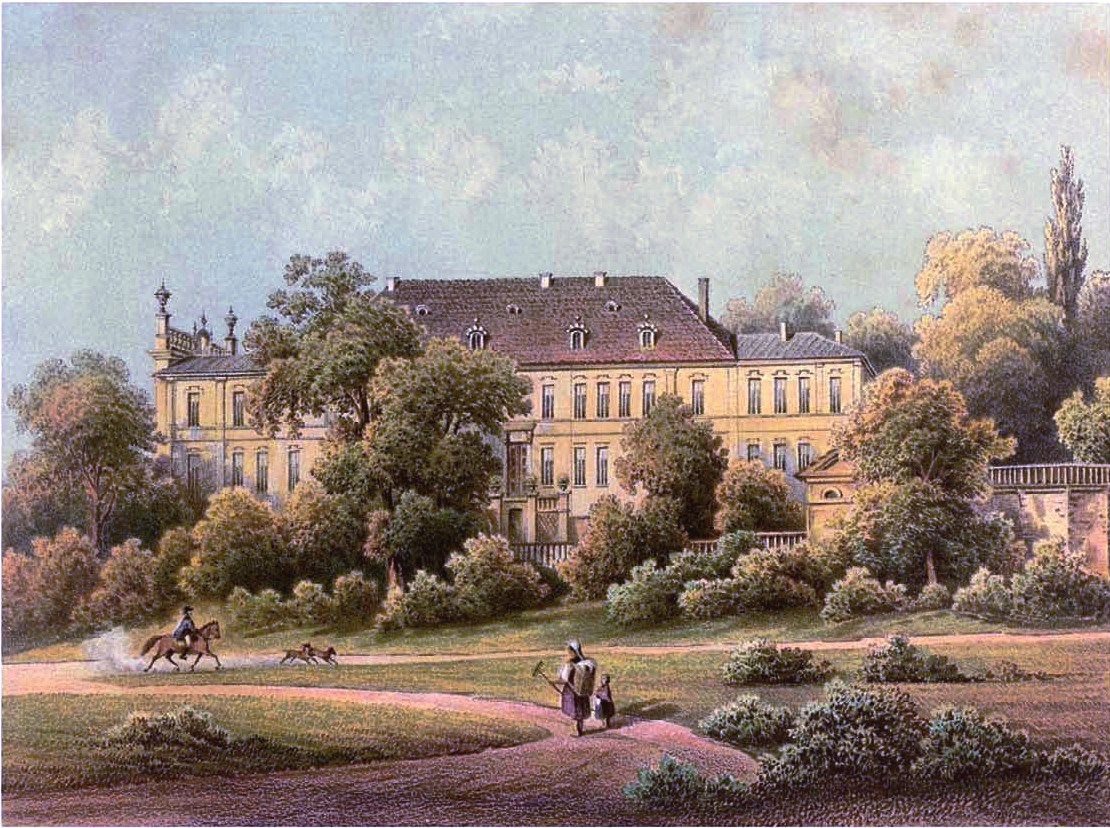
Golßen castle

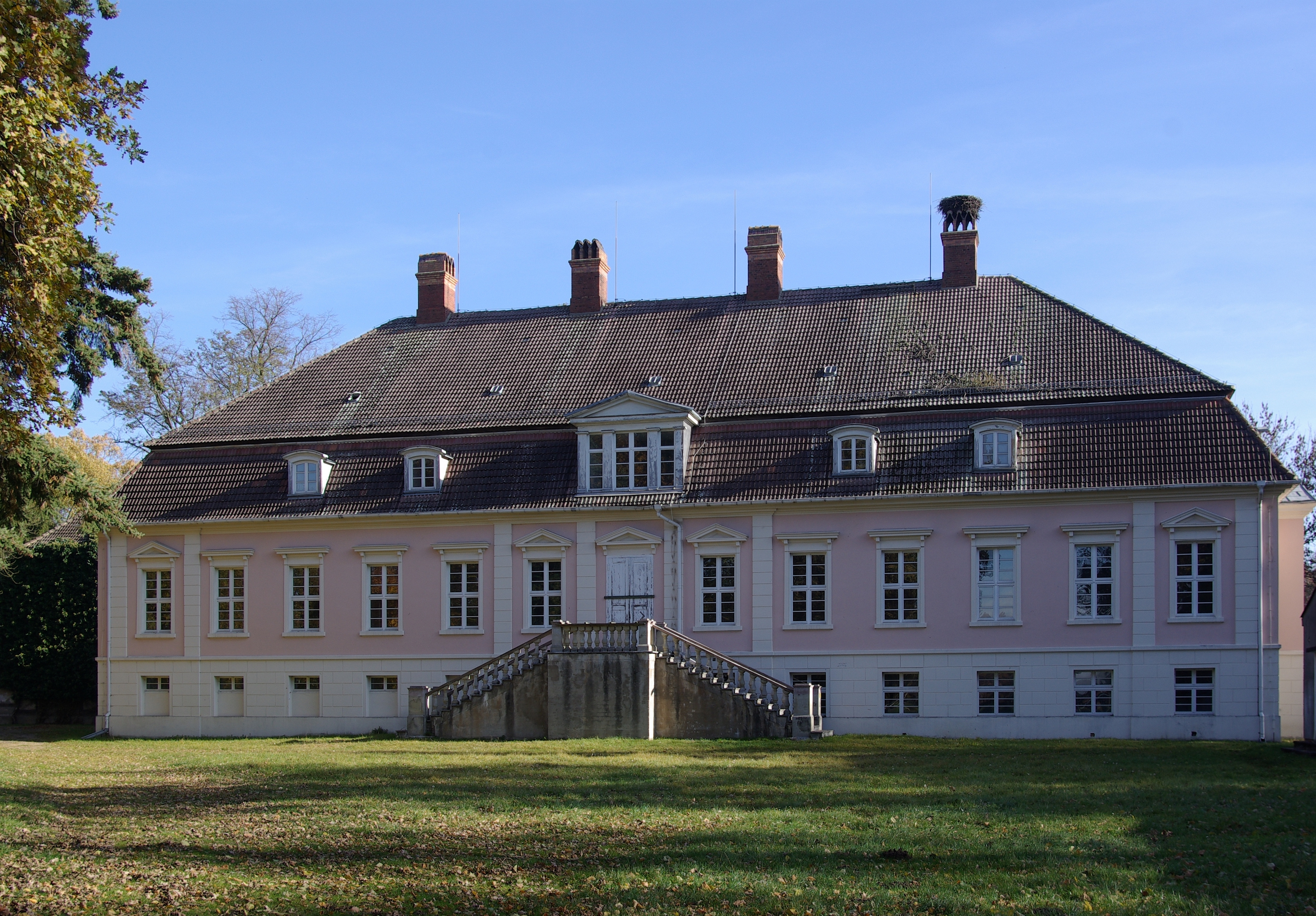
Kasel castle

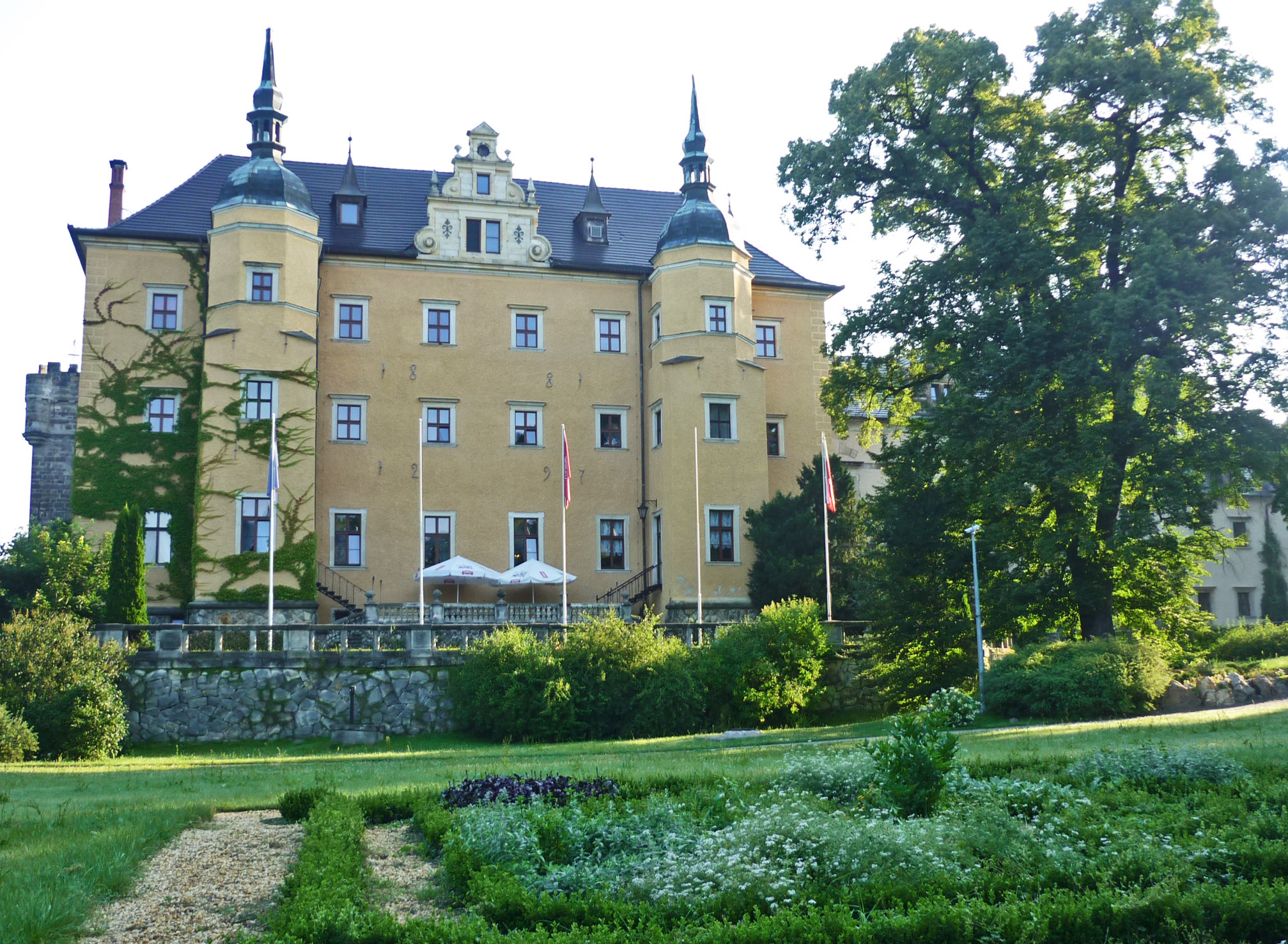
Kliczków Castle (Klitschdorf), Silesia

== Lords ==
- Frederick Magnus, Count of Solms-Laubach (1521-1561)
  - Otto, Count of Solms-Sonnenwalde 1596−1612 (1550-1612), second surviving son
    - Friedrich Albert, Count of Solms-Sonnenwalde 1612−1615 (1592-1615)
  - Johann Georg I, Count of Solms-Laubach (1546-1600), eldest surviving son
    - Johann Georg II, Count of Solms-Baruth in Wildenfels 1615-1632 (1591-1632), sixth surviving son

=== Counts of Solms-Baruth ===
- Johann Georg III, Count 1632–1690 with his brother (1630–1690), fifth and youngest surviving son of Johann Georg II
- Friedrich Sigismund I, Count 1632–1696 initially with his brother (1627-1696), fourth surviving son of Johann Georg II
  - Friedrich Sigismund II, Count 1696–1737 (1669-1737)
    - Friedrich Gottlob Heinrich, Count 1737–1787 (1725-1787)
      - Friedrich Carl Leopold, Count 1787–1801 (1757-1801)
        - Friedrich Heinrich Ludwig, Count 1801–1879 (1795-1879)
          - Friedrich Hermann Carl, Count 1879-1888 (1821-1904), created Fürst 1888

=== Princes (Fürsten) of Solms-Baruth ===
- Fürst Friedrich Hermann Carl, 1st Prince 1888-1904 (1821–1904)
  - Fürst Friedrich Hermann Johann, 2nd Prince 1904–1920 (1853-1920)
    - Fürst Friedrich Hermann Heinrich, 3rd Prince 1920–1951 (1886-1951)
      - Fürst Friedrich Wilhelm Ferdinand, 4th Prince 1951-2006 (1926-2006)
        - Fürst Friedrich Eduard Philipp, 5th Prince 2006–present (born 1963)
        - Count Julian of Solms-Baruth (born 1965)
          - Count Afonso of Solms-Baruth (born 1997)
    - Count Hans Georg Eduard of Solms-Baruth (1893-1971)
      - Count Friedrich-Hans of Solms-Baruth (1923-2006)
        - Count Christian-Friedrich of Solms-Baruth (born 1954)
          - Count Alexander of Solms-Baruth (born 1989)
      - Count Hubertus of Solms-Baruth (1934-1991)
        - Count Ruprecht of Solms-Baruth (born 1963)
          - Count Kasimir of Solms-Baruth (born 1991)
          - Count Humbertus of Solms-Baruth (born 1993)
          - Count Clemens of Solms-Baruth (born 1996)

== See also ==
- Countess Viktoria-Luise of Solms-Baruth
