= Battle of Ciani =

1015 battle of the Polish–German Wars

- Part of the Polish–German Wars
Date	July 1015
Location	Ciani, Duchy of Poland (now Golßen, Brandenburg, Germany) 51°57′01″N 13°38′38″E
Result	Holy Roman Empire victory

Belligerents
Holy Roman Empire	Duchy of Poland

Commanders and leaders
Henry II	Unknown

Casualties and losses
Unknown	Very high

The Battle of Ciani (Polish: Bitwa pod Ciani; German: Schlacht von Ciani) was fought in July 1015 during the Polish–German Wars, between the forces of the Holy Roman Empire led by emperor Henry II, against the forces of the Duchy of Poland. It took place near the gord of Ciani in the Duchy of Poland, now located within the town of Golßen in Brandenburg, Germany. It ended in a decisive victory of the forces of the Holy Roman Empire, the Polish forces sustaining catastrophic casualties.

== History ==
The battle marked the first major clash during the 1015 campaign of emperor Henry II, the ruler of the Holy Roman Empire into the Duchy of Poland during the Polish–German Wars. While his forces were passing through Lusatia, they were attacked in July 1015 by the Polish forces stationed in the fortified settlement of Ciani. The settlement itself later formed the village of Zützen, which is now a district in the town of Golßen in Brandenburg, Germany. It ended in a decisive victory of the forces of the Holy Roman Empire, with the Polish forces sustaining catastrophic casualties.
