= Drahnsdorf station =

Railway station in Drahnsdorf, Germany

Drahnsdorf
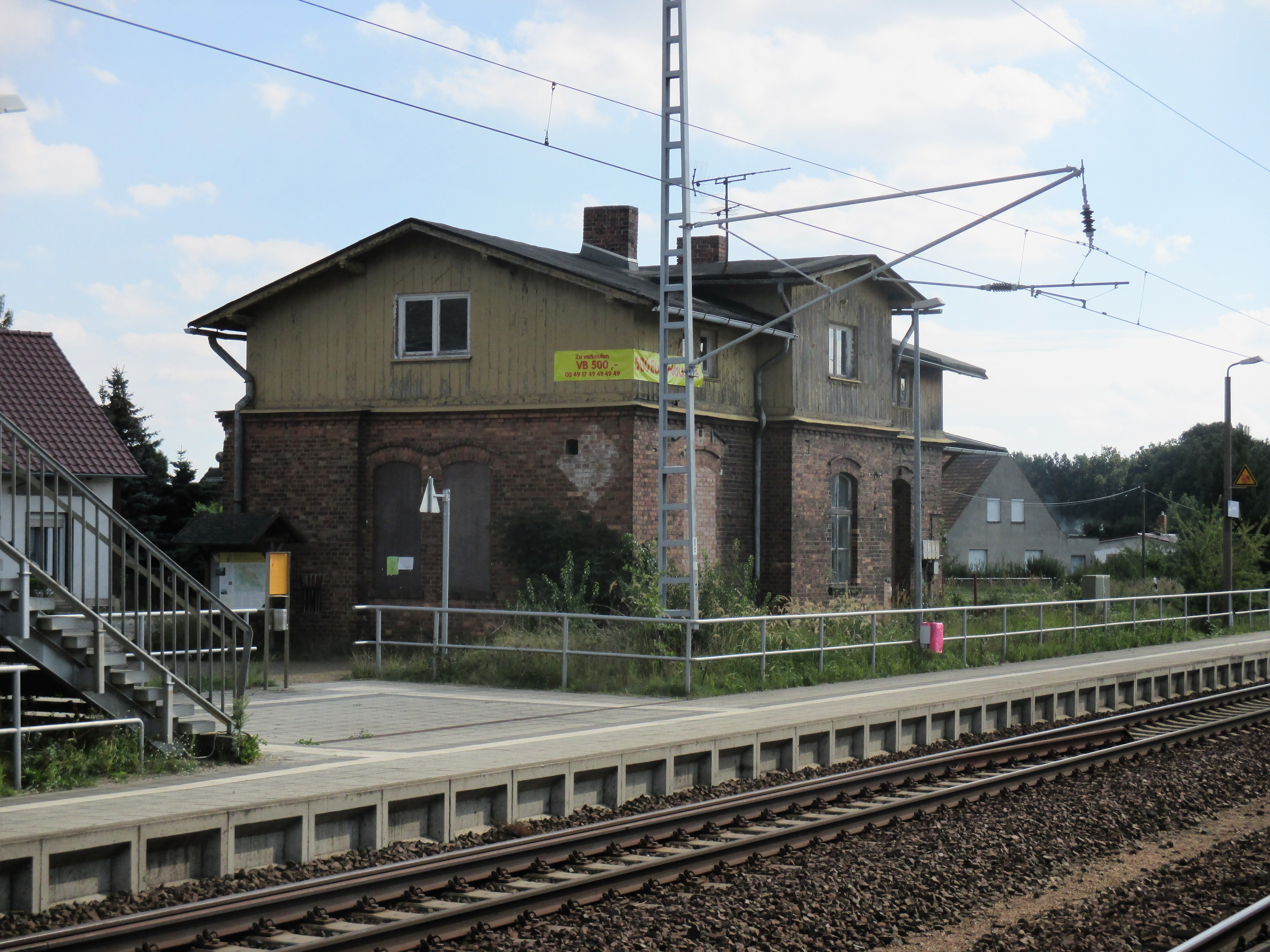
- The station building.

General information
- Location: Drahnsdorf, Brandenburg; Germany
- Coordinates: 51°54′56″N 13°34′53″E
- Line: Berlin–Dresden railway
- Platforms: 2
- Tracks: 2

Construction
- Accessible: Yes

Other information
- Station code: 1333
- DS100 code: BDF
- Category: 6
- Fare zone: VBB: 6858
- Website: www.bahnhof.de

History
- Opened: 17 June 1875

Services
Preceding station	Ostdeutsche Eisenbahn	Following station
Golßen towards Wismar	RE 8	Luckau-Uckro towards Elsterwerda
Location
- Location within Brandenburg

Drahnsdorf (German: Bahnhof Drahnsdorf) is a railway station in the village of Drahnsdorf, Brandenburg, Germany. The station lies on the Berlin–Dresden railway and the train services are operated by Ostdeutsche Eisenbahn.

In the 2026 timetable the following regional service stop at the station:

- Regional services RE 8 Berlin – Berlin Südkreuz – Wunsdorf-Waldstadt – Drahnsdorf – Elsterwerda
