= Golßen station =

Railway station in Golßen, Germany

Golßen (Niederlausitz)
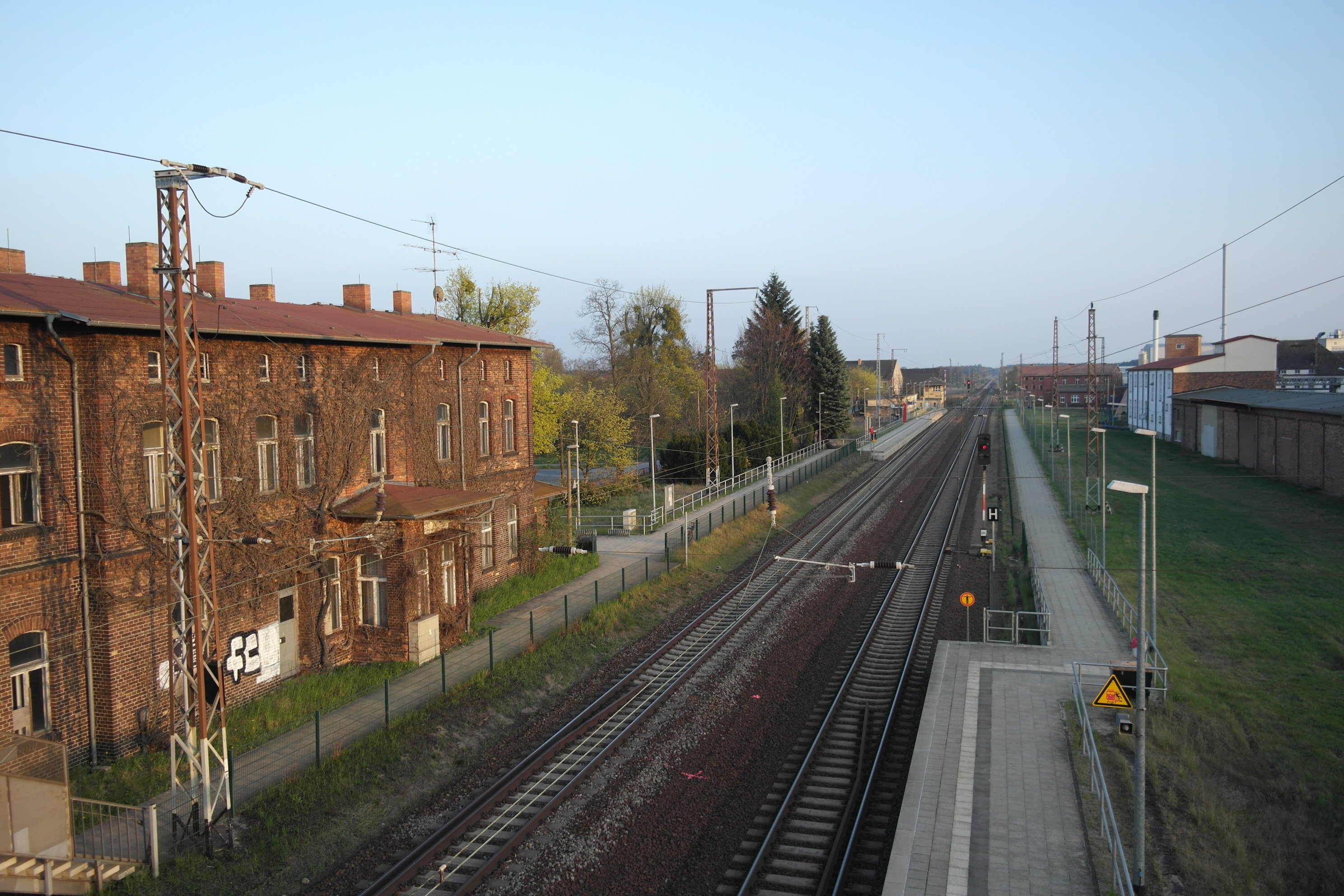
- Golßen railway station

General information
- Location: Golßen, Brandenburg; Germany
- Coordinates: 51°58′23″N 13°34′30″E
- Line: Berlin–Dresden railway
- Platforms: 2
- Tracks: 2

Construction
- Accessible: Yes

Other information
- Station code: 2180
- DS100 code: BGO
- Category: 6
- Fare zone: VBB: 6759
- Website: www.bahnhof.de

History
- Opened: 17 June 1875

Services
Preceding station	Ostdeutsche Eisenbahn	Following station
Klasdorf Glashütte towards Wismar	RE 8	Drahnsdorf towards Elsterwerda
Location
- Location within Brandenburg

Golßen (Niederlausitz) is a railway station in the village of Golßen, Brandenburg, Germany. The station lies of the Berlin–Dresden railway and the train services are operated by Ostdeutsche Eisenbahn.

In the 2026 timetable the following regional services stop at the station:

- Regional services RE 8 Berlin – Berlin Südkreuz – Wunsdorf-Waldstadt – Golßen – Elsterwerda
