= Schönwald, Brandenburg =

Schönwald
- Municipality
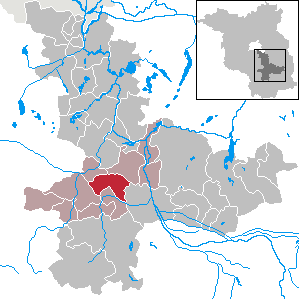
- Location of Schönwald within Dahme-Spreewald district
- Interactive map of Schönwald
- Location within Germany Location within Brandenburg
- Coordinates: 51°59′N 13°42′E
- Country: Germany
- State: Brandenburg
- District: Dahme-Spreewald
- Municipal assoc.: Unterspreewald
- Subdivisions: 2 Ortsteile

Government
  - Mayor (2024–29): Roland Gefreiter

Area
  - Total: 44.93 km^{2} (17.35 sq mi)
- Elevation: 53 m (174 ft)

Population (2025-12-31)
  - Total: 1,251
  - Density: 27.84/km^{2} (72.11/sq mi)
- Time zone: UTC+01:00 (CET)
  - Summer (DST): UTC+02:00 (CEST)
- Postal codes: 15910
- Dialling codes: 035474
- Vehicle registration: LDS
- Website: www.unterspreewald.de

Schönwald (German pronunciation: [ˈʃøːnvalt]) is a municipality in the district of Dahme-Spreewald in Brandenburg in Germany.

== History ==
The present Schönwald as an entity was created from the voluntary merger of two previously independent municipalities, Schönwalde (Lower Sorbian Běły Gózd) und Waldow-Brand. Today it is in the jurisdiction of the district of Unterspreewald, the seat of which is itself in Schönwald.

== Demography ==
Development of population since 1875 within the current boundaries (Blue line: Population; Dotted line: Comparison to population development of Brandenburg state; Grey background: Time of Nazi rule; Red background: Time of communist rule)

Schönwald: Population development
within the current boundaries (2017)

Year	Pop.	±% p.a.
1875	1,436	—
1890	1,314	−0.59%
1910	1,340	+0.10%
1925	1,318	−0.11%
1933	1,447	+1.17%
1939	1,473	+0.30%
1946	2,142	+5.49%
1950	2,004	−1.65%
1964	1,539	−1.87%
1971	1,557	+0.17%
1981	1,419	−0.92%
1985	1,410	−0.16%
1989	1,403	−0.12%
1990	1,376	−1.92%

Year	Pop.	±% p.a.
1991	1,348	−2.03%
1992	1,345	−0.22%
1993	1,612	+19.85%
1994	1,608	−0.25%
1995	1,662	+3.36%
1996	1,654	−0.48%
1997	1,690	+2.18%
1998	1,675	−0.89%
1999	1,290	−22.99%
2000	1,287	−0.23%
2001	1,286	−0.08%
2002	1,262	−1.87%
2003	1,250	−0.95%
2004	1,261	+0.88%

Year	Pop.	±% p.a.
2005	1,263	+0.16%
2006	1,238	−1.98%
2007	1,234	−0.32%
2008	1,202	−2.59%
2009	1,196	−0.50%
2010	1,175	−1.76%
2011	1,170	−0.43%
2012	1,171	+0.09%
2013	1,144	−2.31%
2014	1,141	−0.26%
2015	1,129	−1.05%
2016	1,170	+3.63%
2017	1,155	−1.28%
