= Bersteland =

- Municipality
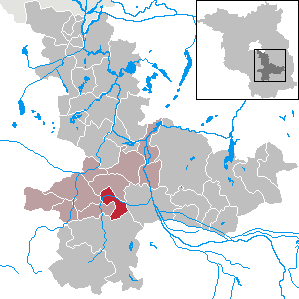
- Location of Bersteland within Dahme-Spreewald district
- Interactive map of Bersteland
- Location within Germany Location within Brandenburg
- Coordinates: 51°57′00″N 13°45′00″E
- Country: Germany
- State: Brandenburg
- District: Dahme-Spreewald
- Municipal assoc.: Unterspreewald

Government
  - Mayor (2024–29): Manuela Paulick

Area
  - Total: 29.31 km^{2} (11.32 sq mi)
- Elevation: 54 m (177 ft)

Population (2025-12-31)
  - Total: 847
  - Density: 28.9/km^{2} (74.8/sq mi)
- Time zone: UTC+01:00 (CET)
  - Summer (DST): UTC+02:00 (CEST)
- Postal codes: 15910
- Dialling codes: 035474
- Vehicle registration: LDS
- Website: www.unterspreewald.de

Bersteland is a municipality in the district of Dahme-Spreewald in Brandenburg in Germany.

== Demography ==
Development of population since 1875 within the current boundaries (Blue line: Population; Dotted line: Comparison to population development of Brandenburg state; Grey background: Time of Nazi rule; Red background: Time of communist rule)

Bersteland: Population development
within the current boundaries (2020)

Year	Pop.	±% p.a.
1875	1,256	—
1890	1,357	+0.52%
1910	1,259	−0.37%
1925	1,111	−0.83%
1933	1,104	−0.08%
1939	1,101	−0.05%
1946	1,471	+4.23%
1950	1,198	−5.00%
1964	982	−1.41%
1971	936	−0.68%
1981	891	−0.49%
1985	889	−0.06%
1989	894	+0.14%
1990	870	−2.68%
1991	850	−2.30%

Year	Pop.	±% p.a.
1992	839	−1.29%
1993	837	−0.24%
1994	831	−0.72%
1995	834	+0.36%
1996	886	+6.24%
1997	903	+1.92%
1998	919	+1.77%
1999	929	+1.09%
2000	929	+0.00%
2001	930	+0.11%
2002	911	−2.04%
2003	937	+2.85%
2004	937	+0.00%
2005	934	−0.32%
2006	937	+0.32%

Year	Pop.	±% p.a.
2007	923	−1.49%
2008	930	+0.76%
2009	916	−1.51%
2010	925	+0.98%
2011	915	−1.08%
2012	907	−0.87%
2013	902	−0.55%
2014	895	−0.78%
2015	896	+0.11%
2016	901	+0.56%
2017	880	−2.33%
2018	894	+1.59%
2019	902	+0.89%
2020	889	−1.44%
