= Rietzneuendorf-Staakow =

- Municipality
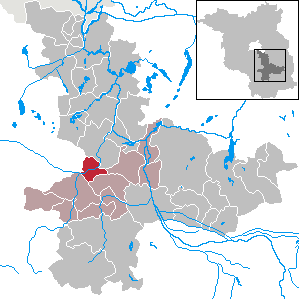
- Location of Rietzneuendorf-Staakow within Dahme-Spreewald district
- Interactive map of Rietzneuendorf-Staakow
- Location within Germany Location within Brandenburg
- Coordinates: 52°01′00″N 13°40′00″E
- Country: Germany
- State: Brandenburg
- District: Dahme-Spreewald
- Municipal assoc.: Unterspreewald
- Subdivisions: 3 Ortsteile

Government
  - Mayor (2024–29): Andeas Andrack

Area
  - Total: 27.99 km^{2} (10.81 sq mi)
- Elevation: 52 m (171 ft)

Population (2025-12-31)
  - Total: 612
  - Density: 21.9/km^{2} (56.6/sq mi)
- Time zone: UTC+01:00 (CET)
  - Summer (DST): UTC+02:00 (CEST)
- Postal codes: 15910
- Dialling codes: 035477
- Vehicle registration: LDS
- Website: www.unterspreewald.de

Rietzneuendorf-Staakow is a municipality in the district of Dahme-Spreewald in Brandenburg in Germany.

== Demography ==
Development of population since 1875 within the current boundaries (Blue line: Population; Dotted line: Comparison to population development of Brandenburg state; Grey background: Time of Nazi rule; Red background: Time of communist rule)

Rietzneuendorf-Staakow: Population development
within the current boundaries (2017)

Year	Pop.	±% p.a.
1875	1,107	—
1890	1,135	+0.17%
1910	886	−1.23%
1925	985	+0.71%
1933	908	−1.01%
1939	933	+0.45%
1946	1,261	+4.40%
1950	1,216	−0.90%
1964	932	−1.88%
1971	880	−0.82%
1981	804	−0.90%
1985	786	−0.56%
1989	738	−1.56%
1990	726	−1.63%

Year	Pop.	±% p.a.
1991	718	−1.10%
1992	733	+2.09%
1993	729	−0.55%
1994	713	−2.19%
1995	705	−1.12%
1996	700	−0.71%
1997	715	+2.14%
1998	715	+0.00%
1999	727	+1.68%
2000	717	−1.38%
2001	708	−1.26%
2002	720	+1.69%
2003	712	−1.11%
2004	689	−3.23%

Year	Pop.	±% p.a.
2005	680	−1.31%
2006	670	−1.47%
2007	669	−0.15%
2008	666	−0.45%
2009	651	−2.25%
2010	641	−1.54%
2011	610	−4.84%
2012	605	−0.82%
2013	626	+3.47%
2014	609	−2.72%
2015	613	+0.66%
2016	615	+0.33%
2017	597	−2.93%
