= Schlepzig =

Schlepzig/Slopišća
- Municipality
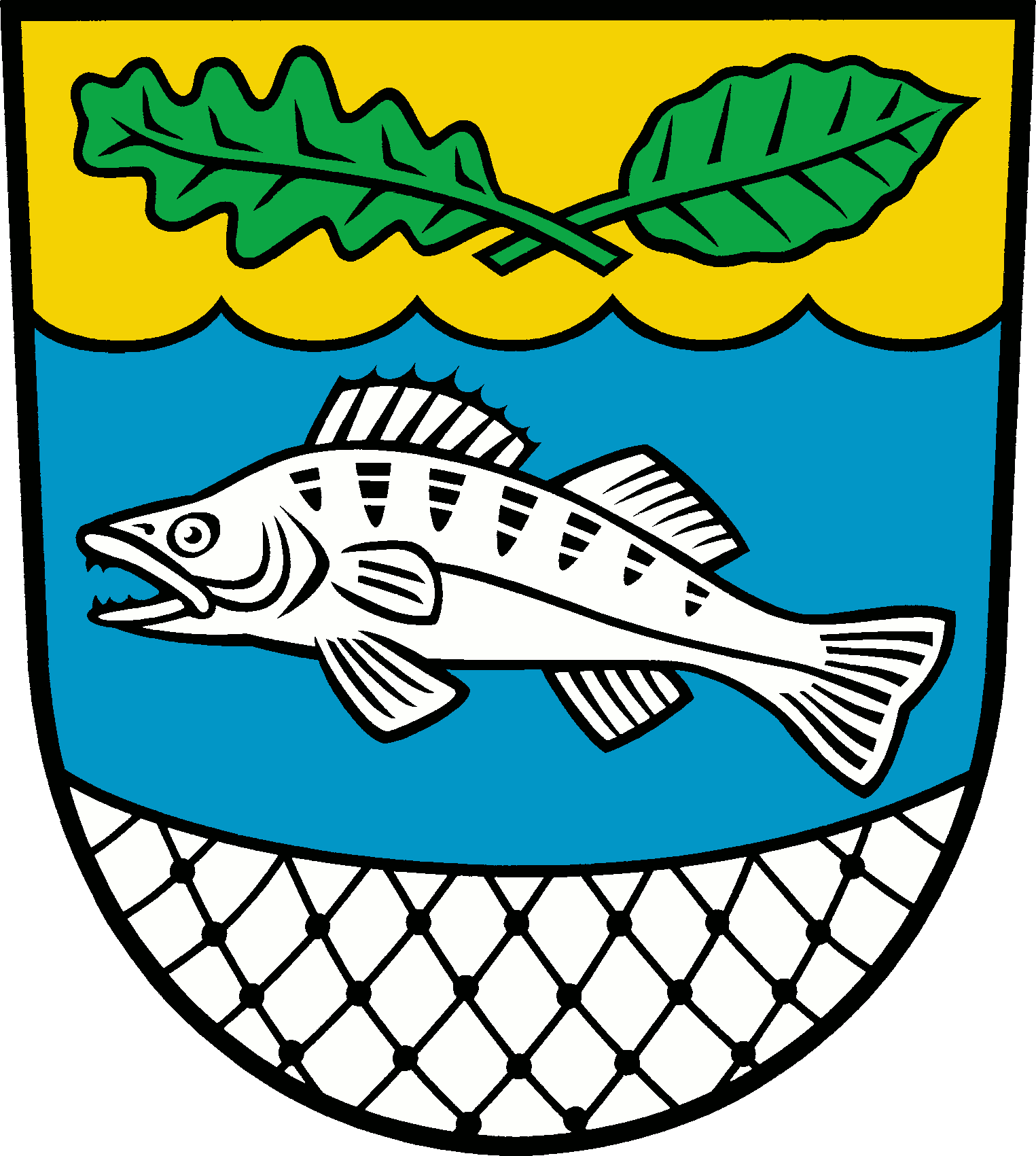
- Coat of arms

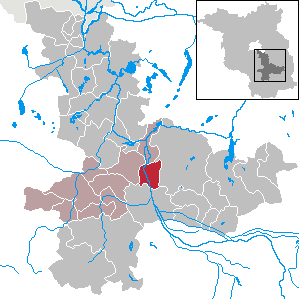
- Location of Schlepzig/Slopišća within Dahme-Spreewald district
- Interactive map of Schlepzig/Slopišća
- Location within Germany Location within Brandenburg
- Coordinates: 52°01′44″N 13°53′43″E
- Country: Germany
- State: Brandenburg
- District: Dahme-Spreewald
- Municipal assoc.: Unterspreewald

Government
  - Mayor (2024–29): Werner Hämmerling

Area
  - Total: 30.66 km^{2} (11.84 sq mi)
- Elevation: 47 m (154 ft)

Population (2025-12-31)
  - Total: 602
  - Density: 19.6/km^{2} (50.9/sq mi)
- Time zone: UTC+01:00 (CET)
  - Summer (DST): UTC+02:00 (CEST)
- Postal codes: 15910
- Dialling codes: 035472
- Vehicle registration: LDS
- Website: www.schlepzig.com

Schlepzig (German, pronounced [ˈʃlɛptsɪç]) or Slopišća (Lower Sorbian) is a municipality in the Dahme-Spreewald district in the state of Brandenburg in Germany.

The municipality is in the Sorbian settlement area; the German and Lower Sorbian languages have equal status.

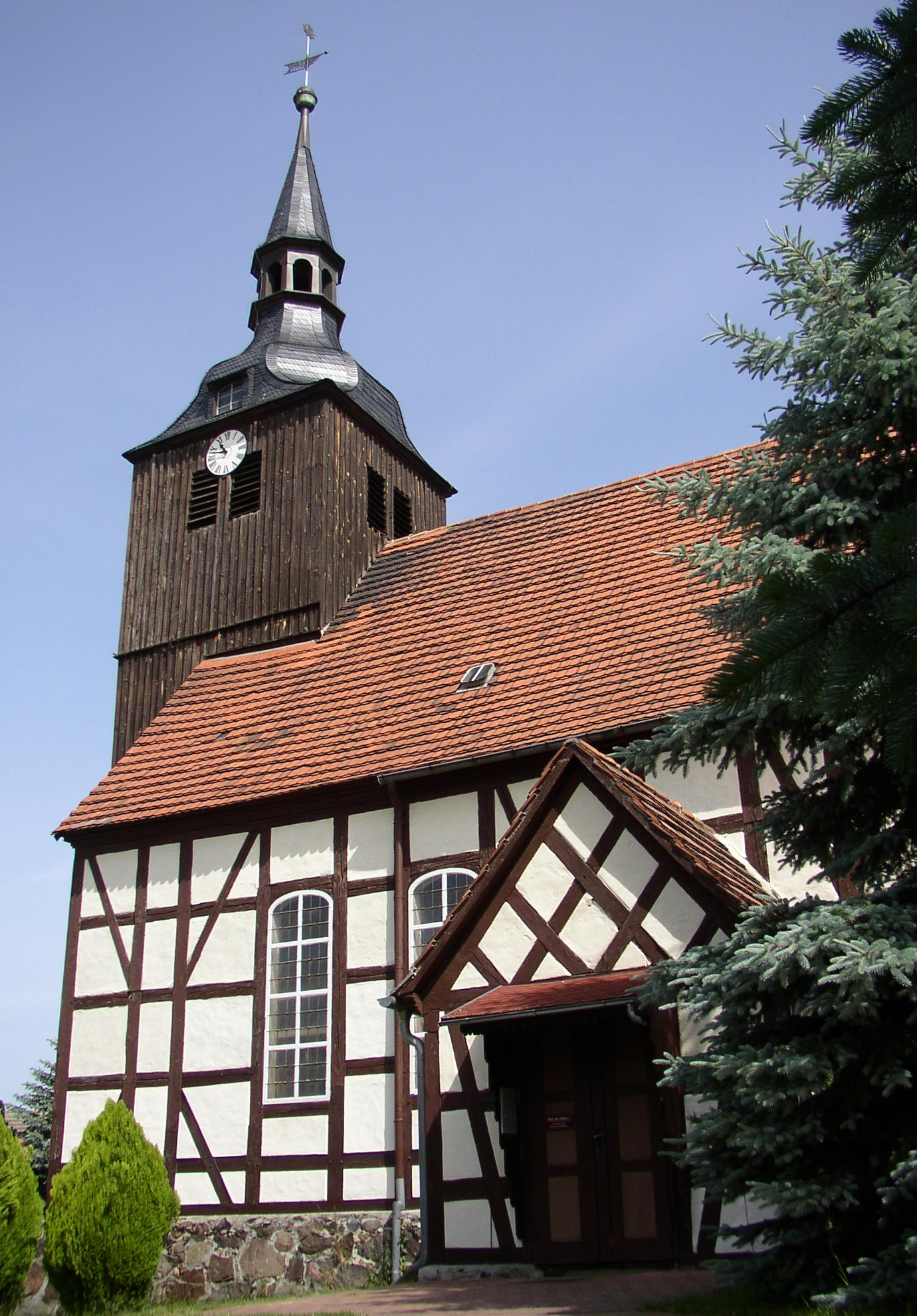
Village church

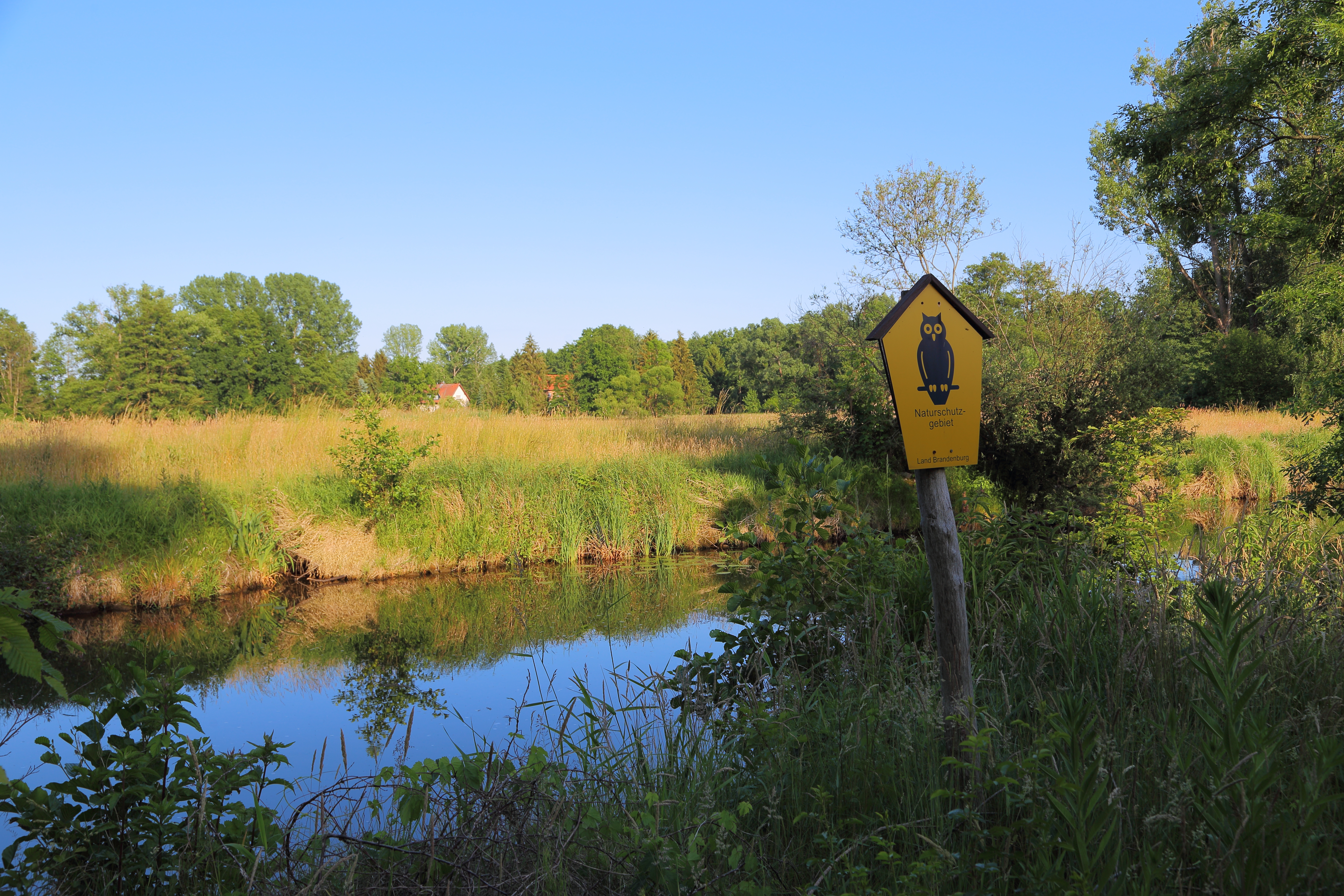
The Innerer Unterspreewald nature reserve nearby

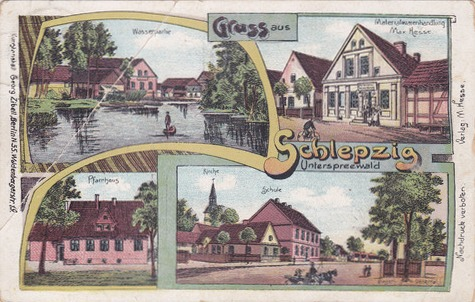
Postcard from c. 1900

== Demography ==
Development of population since 1875 within the current boundaries (Blue line: Population; Dotted line: Comparison to population development of Brandenburg state; Grey background: Time of Nazi rule; Red background: Time of communist rule)

Schlepzig: Population development
within the current boundaries (2017)

| Year | Pop. | ±% p.a. |
|---|---|---|
| 1875 | 921 | — |
| 1890 | 968 | +0.33% |
| 1910 | 993 | +0.13% |
| 1925 | 874 | −0.85% |
| 1933 | 831 | −0.63% |
| 1939 | 814 | −0.34% |
| 1946 | 1,239 | +6.19% |
| 1950 | 1,191 | −0.98% |
| 1964 | 828 | −2.56% |
| 1971 | 759 | −1.24% |
| 1981 | 670 | −1.24% |
| 1985 | 631 | −1.49% |
| 1989 | 640 | +0.35% |
| 1990 | 639 | −0.16% |

| Year | Pop. | ±% p.a. |
|---|---|---|
| 1991 | 629 | −1.56% |
| 1992 | 628 | −0.16% |
| 1993 | 636 | +1.27% |
| 1994 | 631 | −0.79% |
| 1995 | 633 | +0.32% |
| 1996 | 620 | −2.05% |
| 1997 | 639 | +3.06% |
| 1998 | 655 | +2.50% |
| 1999 | 664 | +1.37% |
| 2000 | 665 | +0.15% |
| 2001 | 672 | +1.05% |
| 2002 | 659 | −1.93% |
| 2003 | 652 | −1.06% |
| 2004 | 656 | +0.61% |

| Year | Pop. | ±% p.a. |
|---|---|---|
| 2005 | 654 | −0.30% |
| 2006 | 652 | −0.31% |
| 2007 | 637 | −2.30% |
| 2008 | 641 | +0.63% |
| 2009 | 629 | −1.87% |
| 2010 | 618 | −1.75% |
| 2011 | 599 | −3.07% |
| 2012 | 605 | +1.00% |
| 2013 | 610 | +0.83% |
| 2014 | 614 | +0.66% |
| 2015 | 619 | +0.81% |
| 2016 | 608 | −1.78% |
| 2017 | 607 | −0.16% |
