= Unterspreewald =

- Municipality
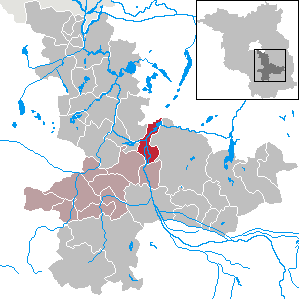
- Location of Unterspreewald within Dahme-Spreewald district
- Interactive map of Unterspreewald
- Location within Germany Location within Brandenburg
- Coordinates: 52°05′00″N 13°52′00″E
- Country: Germany
- State: Brandenburg
- District: Dahme-Spreewald
- Municipal assoc.: Unterspreewald
- Subdivisions: 3 Ortsteile

Government
  - Mayor (2024–29): Daniel Neumann

Area
  - Total: 25.8 km^{2} (10.0 sq mi)
- Elevation: 72 m (236 ft)

Population (2025-12-31)
  - Total: 727
  - Density: 28.2/km^{2} (73.0/sq mi)
- Time zone: UTC+01:00 (CET)
  - Summer (DST): UTC+02:00 (CEST)
- Postal codes: 15910
- Dialling codes: 035473
- Vehicle registration: LDS
- Website: www.unterspreewald.de

Unterspreewald is a municipality in the district of Dahme-Spreewald in Brandenburg in Germany.

== Demography ==
Development of population since 1875 within the current boundaries (Blue line: Population; Dotted line: Comparison to population development of Brandenburg state; Grey background: Time of Nazi rule; Red background: Time of communist rule)

Unterspreewald: Population development
within the current boundaries (2017)

Year	Pop.	±% p.a.
1875	1,498	—
1890	1,542	+0.19%
1910	1,301	−0.85%
1925	1,191	−0.59%
1933	1,178	−0.14%
1939	1,136	−0.60%
1946	1,490	+3.95%
1950	1,393	−1.67%
1964	1,010	−2.27%
1971	964	−0.66%
1981	945	−0.20%
1985	959	+0.37%
1989	982	+0.59%
1990	982	+0.00%

Year	Pop.	±% p.a.
1991	995	+1.32%
1992	966	−2.91%
1993	955	−1.14%
1994	944	−1.15%
1995	939	−0.53%
1996	930	−0.96%
1997	906	−2.58%
1998	913	+0.77%
1999	922	+0.99%
2000	893	−3.15%
2001	906	+1.46%
2002	898	−0.88%
2003	892	−0.67%
2004	889	−0.34%

Year	Pop.	±% p.a.
2005	869	−2.25%
2006	857	−1.38%
2007	871	+1.63%
2008	863	−0.92%
2009	860	−0.35%
2010	862	+0.23%
2011	860	−0.23%
2012	868	+0.93%
2013	855	−1.50%
2014	830	−2.92%
2015	851	+2.53%
2016	845	−0.71%
2017	829	−1.89%
