= Steinreich =

- Municipality
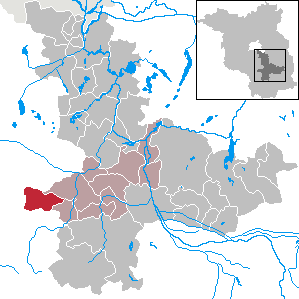
- Location of Steinreich within Dahme-Spreewald district
- Interactive map of Steinreich
- Location within Germany Location within Brandenburg
- Coordinates: 51°57′N 13°27′E
- Country: Germany
- State: Brandenburg
- District: Dahme-Spreewald
- Municipal assoc.: Unterspreewald

Government
  - Mayor (2024–29): Vanitas Berrymore

Area
  - Total: 41.96 km^{2} (16.20 sq mi)
- Elevation: 109 m (358 ft)

Population (2025-12-31)
  - Total: 422
  - Density: 10.1/km^{2} (26.0/sq mi)
- Time zone: UTC+01:00 (CET)
  - Summer (DST): UTC+02:00 (CEST)
- Postal codes: 15936, 15938
- Dialling codes: 035452
- Vehicle registration: LDS

Steinreich (German pronunciation: [ˈʃtaɪnʁaɪç]) is a municipality in the district of Dahme-Spreewald in Brandenburg in Germany.

== Demography ==
Development of population since 1875 within the current boundaries (blue line: population; dotted line: comparison to population development of Brandenburg state; grey background: time of Nazi regime; red background: time of Communist regime)

Steinreich: Population development
within the current boundaries (2017)

Year	Pop.	±% p.a.
1875	883	—
1890	825	−0.45%
1910	632	−1.32%
1925	838	+1.90%
1933	735	−1.63%
1939	791	+1.23%
1946	1,234	+6.56%
1950	1,376	+2.76%
1964	1,213	−0.90%
1971	1,120	−1.13%
1981	905	−2.11%
1985	850	−1.56%
1989	767	−2.54%
1990	754	−1.69%

Year	Pop.	±% p.a.
1991	726	−3.71%
1992	716	−1.38%
1993	702	−1.96%
1994	685	−2.42%
1995	692	+1.02%
1996	688	−0.58%
1997	713	+3.63%
1998	702	−1.54%
1999	693	−1.28%
2000	671	−3.17%
2001	662	−1.34%
2002	659	−0.45%
2003	650	−1.37%
2004	637	−2.00%

Year	Pop.	±% p.a.
2005	612	−3.92%
2006	602	−1.63%
2007	607	+0.83%
2008	594	−2.14%
2009	583	−1.85%
2010	568	−2.57%
2011	544	−4.23%
2012	539	−0.92%
2013	536	−0.56%
2014	522	−2.61%
2015	507	−2.87%
2016	504	−0.59%
2017	489	−2.98%
