= Leibsch =

Municipality in Germany

Coordinates: 52.080957°N 13.877749°E

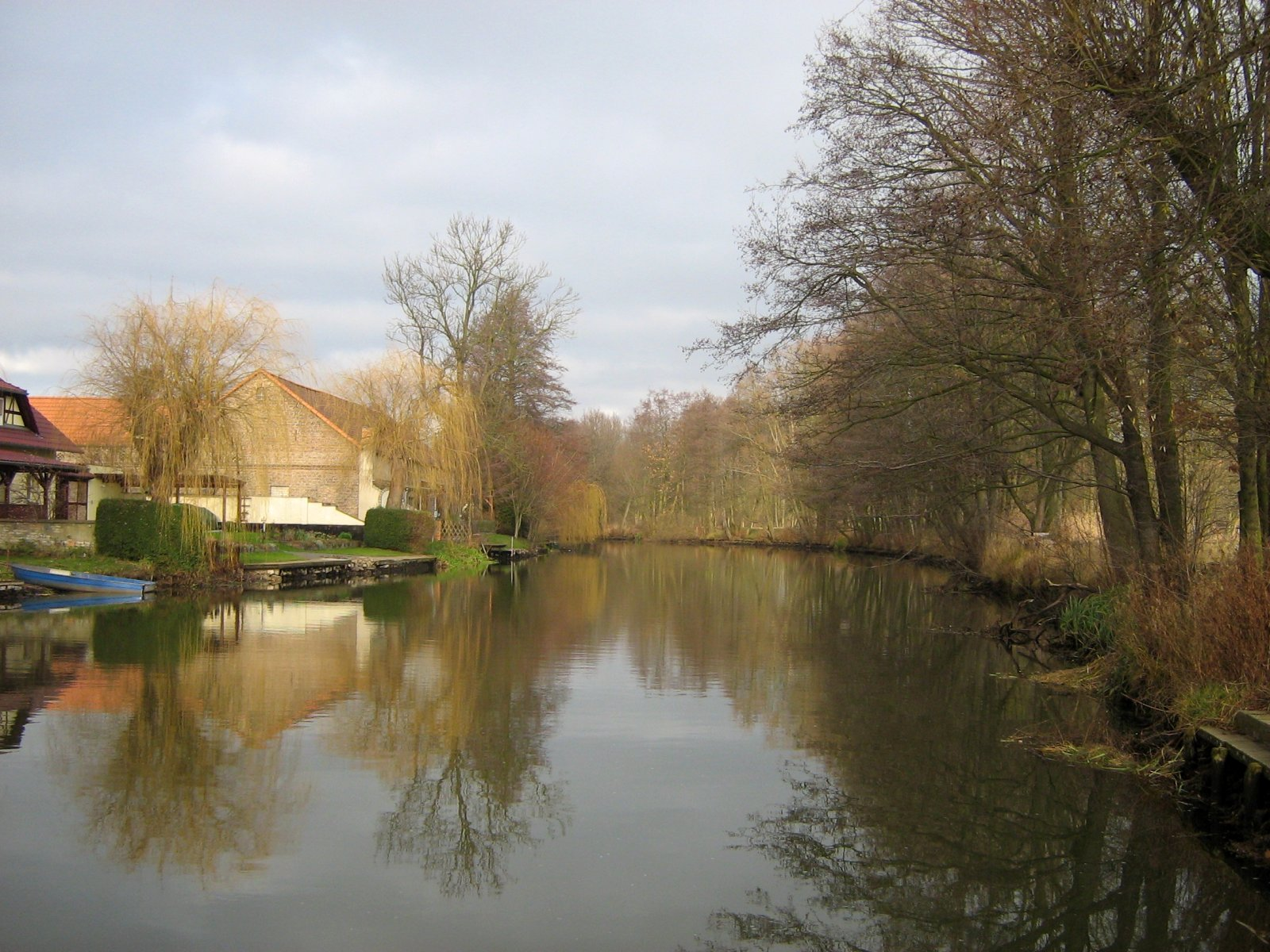
The Spree at Leibsch

Leibsch is a locality (ortsteil) in the municipality (gemeinde) of Unterspreewald in the German state (land) of Brandenburg. It is located on the River Spree in the Spreewald.
