= Märkisch Buchholz =

- Town
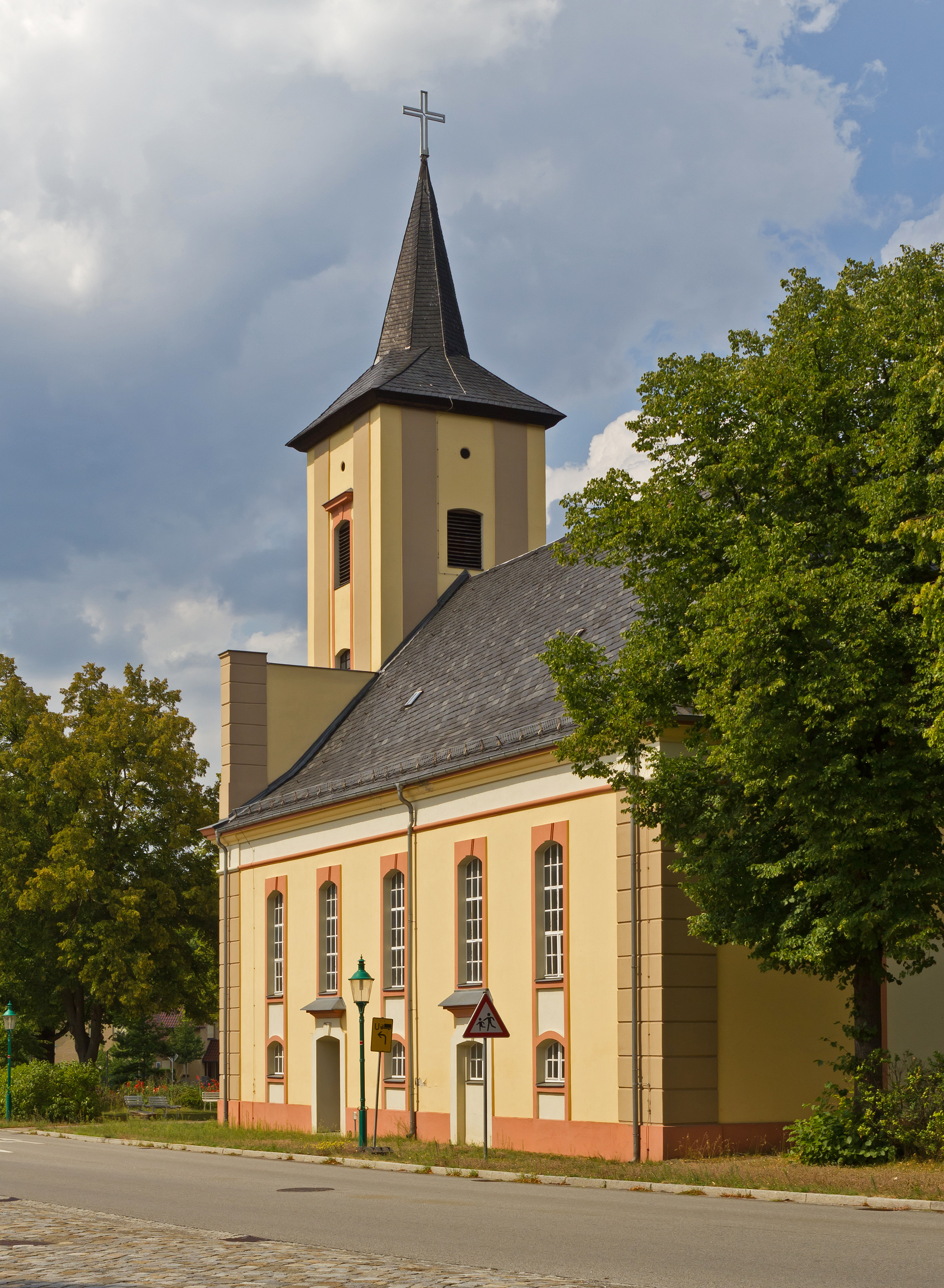
- Church

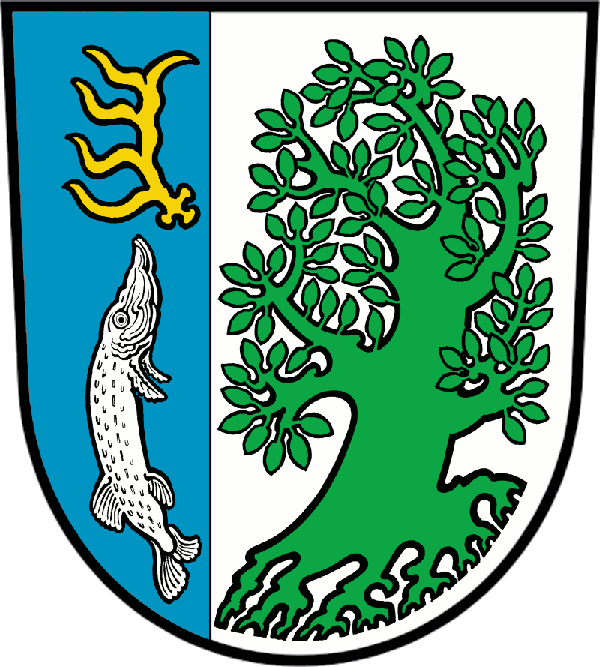
- Coat of arms

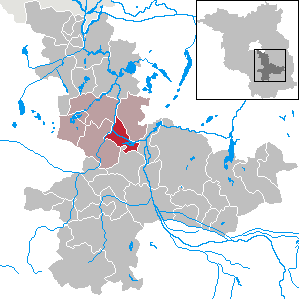
- Location of Märkisch Buchholz within Dahme-Spreewald district
- Interactive map of Märkisch Buchholz
- Location within Germany Location within Brandenburg
- Coordinates: 52°06′N 13°45′E
- Country: Germany
- State: Brandenburg
- District: Dahme-Spreewald
- Municipal assoc.: Schenkenländchen
- Subdivisions: 3 Ortsteile

Government
  - Mayor (2024–29): Arno Winklmann

Area
  - Total: 24.86 km^{2} (9.60 sq mi)
- Elevation: 42 m (138 ft)

Population (2025-12-31)
  - Total: 847
  - Density: 34.1/km^{2} (88.2/sq mi)
- Time zone: UTC+01:00 (CET)
  - Summer (DST): UTC+02:00 (CEST)
- Postal codes: 15748
- Dialling codes: 033765
- Vehicle registration: LDS
- Website: www.maerkischbuchholz.de

Märkisch Buchholz (German pronunciation: [ˈmɛʁkɪʃ ˈbuːxhɔlts]) is a small town in the Dahme-Spreewald district, in Brandenburg, Germany. It is situated on the river Dahme, 20 km northwest of Lübben (Spreewald) and resp. 50 km southeast of Berlin.

== Overview ==
The town is the smallest one in Brandenburg with town status. Founded in the 12th or 13th century the town's first historical mention dated on 13 August 1301, described as castrum et oppidum Buchholt. The town was heavily destroyed during the last day of World War II, due to strategic position at the Dahme river in Battle of Halbe. The federal highway B179 connect the town direct with Berlin.

== Demography ==
Development of population since 1875 within the current boundaries (blue line: population; dotted line: comparison to population development of Brandenburg state; grey background: time of Nazi rule; red background: time of communist rule)

Märkisch Buchholz: Population development
within the current boundaries (2017)

Year	Pop.	±% p.a.
1875	1,401	—
1890	1,451	+0.23%
1910	1,303	−0.54%
1925	1,125	−0.97%
1933	1,185	+0.65%
1939	1,213	+0.39%
1946	1,246	+0.38%
1950	1,229	−0.34%
1964	1,032	−1.24%
1971	1,000	−0.45%
1981	941	−0.61%
1985	944	+0.08%
1989	888	−1.52%
1990	884	−0.45%

Year	Pop.	±% p.a.
1991	861	−2.60%
1992	864	+0.35%
1993	868	+0.46%
1994	861	−0.81%
1995	862	+0.12%
1996	832	−3.48%
1997	847	+1.80%
1998	881	+4.01%
1999	871	−1.14%
2000	874	+0.34%
2001	872	−0.23%
2002	836	−4.13%
2003	842	+0.72%
2004	840	−0.24%

Year	Pop.	±% p.a.
2005	833	−0.83%
2006	810	−2.76%
2007	818	+0.99%
2008	805	−1.59%
2009	793	−1.49%
2010	780	−1.64%
2011	759	−2.69%
2012	771	+1.58%
2013	769	−0.26%
2014	740	−3.77%
2015	773	+4.46%
2016	786	+1.68%
2017	804	+2.29%

== See also ==
- Köthener See
