= Drahnsdorf =

- Municipality
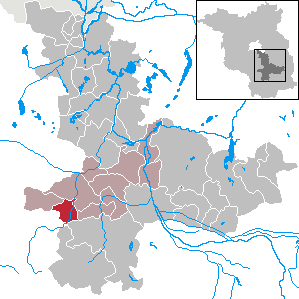
- Location of Drahnsdorf within Dahme-Spreewald district
- Interactive map of Drahnsdorf
- Location within Germany Location within Brandenburg
- Coordinates: 51°55′N 13°35′E
- Country: Germany
- State: Brandenburg
- District: Dahme-Spreewald
- Municipal assoc.: Unterspreewald
- Subdivisions: 4 Ortsteile bzw. Gemeindeteile

Government
  - Mayor (2024–29): Steffen Buhl

Area
  - Total: 26.92 km^{2} (10.39 sq mi)
- Elevation: 66 m (217 ft)

Population (2025-12-31)
  - Total: 685
  - Density: 25.4/km^{2} (65.9/sq mi)
- Time zone: UTC+01:00 (CET)
  - Summer (DST): UTC+02:00 (CEST)
- Postal codes: 15938
- Dialling codes: 035453
- Vehicle registration: LDS

Drahnsdorf is a municipality in the district of Dahme-Spreewald in Brandenburg, Germany.

== Demography ==
Development of population since 1875 within the current boundaries (Blue line: Population; Dotted line: Comparison to population development of Brandenburg state; Grey background: Time of Nazi rule; Red background: Time of communist rule)

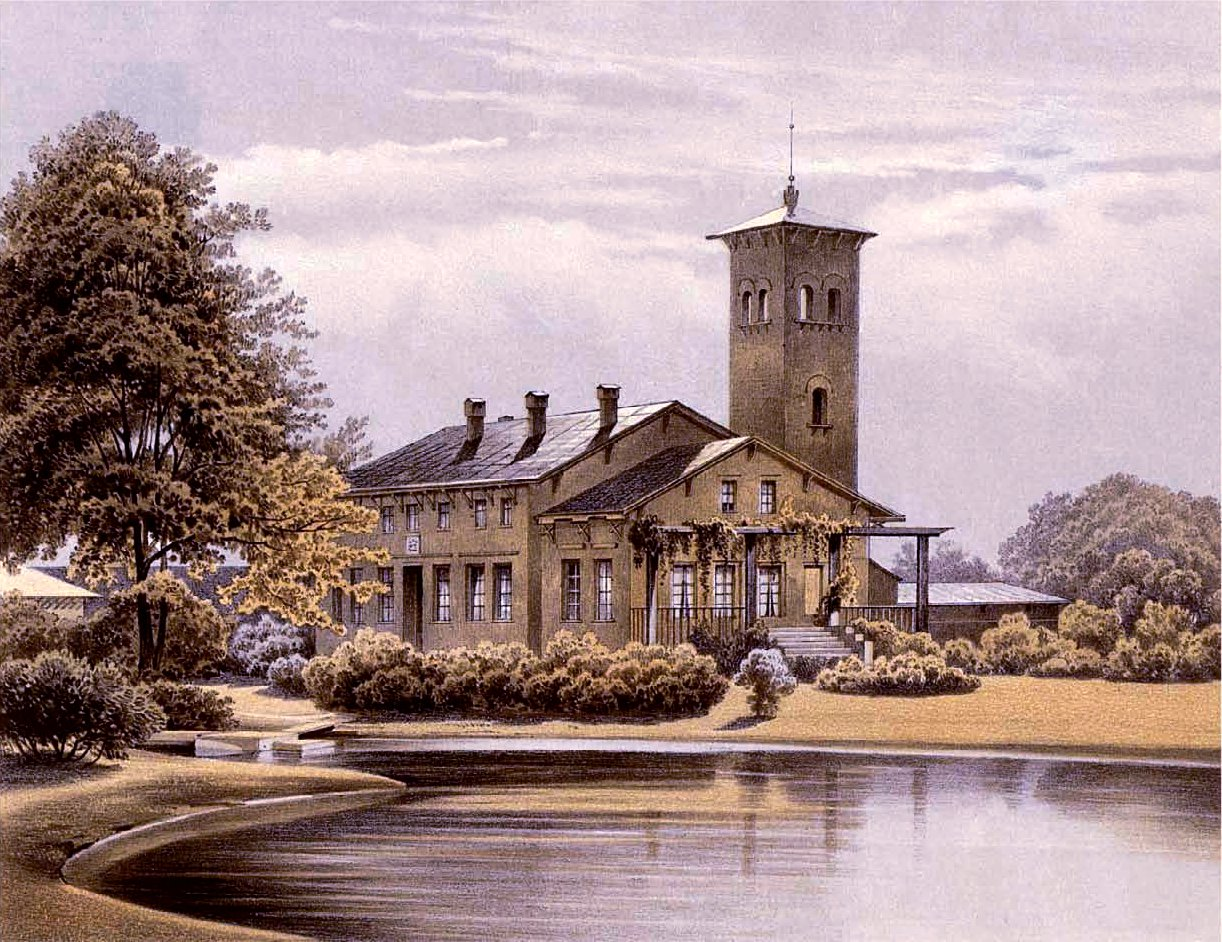
House Krossen, around 1860, Edition by Alexander Duncker

Drahnsdorf: Population development
within the current boundaries (2020)

Year	Pop.	±% p.a.
1875	921	—
1890	874	−0.35%
1910	760	−0.70%
1925	807	+0.40%
1933	685	−2.03%
1939	694	+0.22%
1946	1,292	+9.28%
1950	1,137	−3.14%
1964	940	−1.35%
1971	913	−0.42%
1981	783	−1.52%
1985	739	−1.44%
1989	757	+0.60%
1990	739	−2.38%
1991	729	−1.35%

Year	Pop.	±% p.a.
1992	738	+1.23%
1993	756	+2.44%
1994	754	−0.26%
1995	760	+0.80%
1996	740	−2.63%
1997	710	−4.05%
1998	730	+2.82%
1999	729	−0.14%
2000	715	−1.92%
2001	702	−1.82%
2002	686	−2.28%
2003	676	−1.46%
2004	677	+0.15%
2005	665	−1.77%
2006	648	−2.56%

Year	Pop.	±% p.a.
2007	641	−1.08%
2008	649	+1.25%
2009	633	−2.47%
2010	622	−1.74%
2011	592	−4.82%
2012	586	−1.01%
2013	588	+0.34%
2014	584	−0.68%
2015	611	+4.62%
2016	612	+0.16%
2017	615	+0.49%
2018	618	+0.49%
2019	654	+5.83%
2020	675	+3.21%
