= Golßen =

- Town
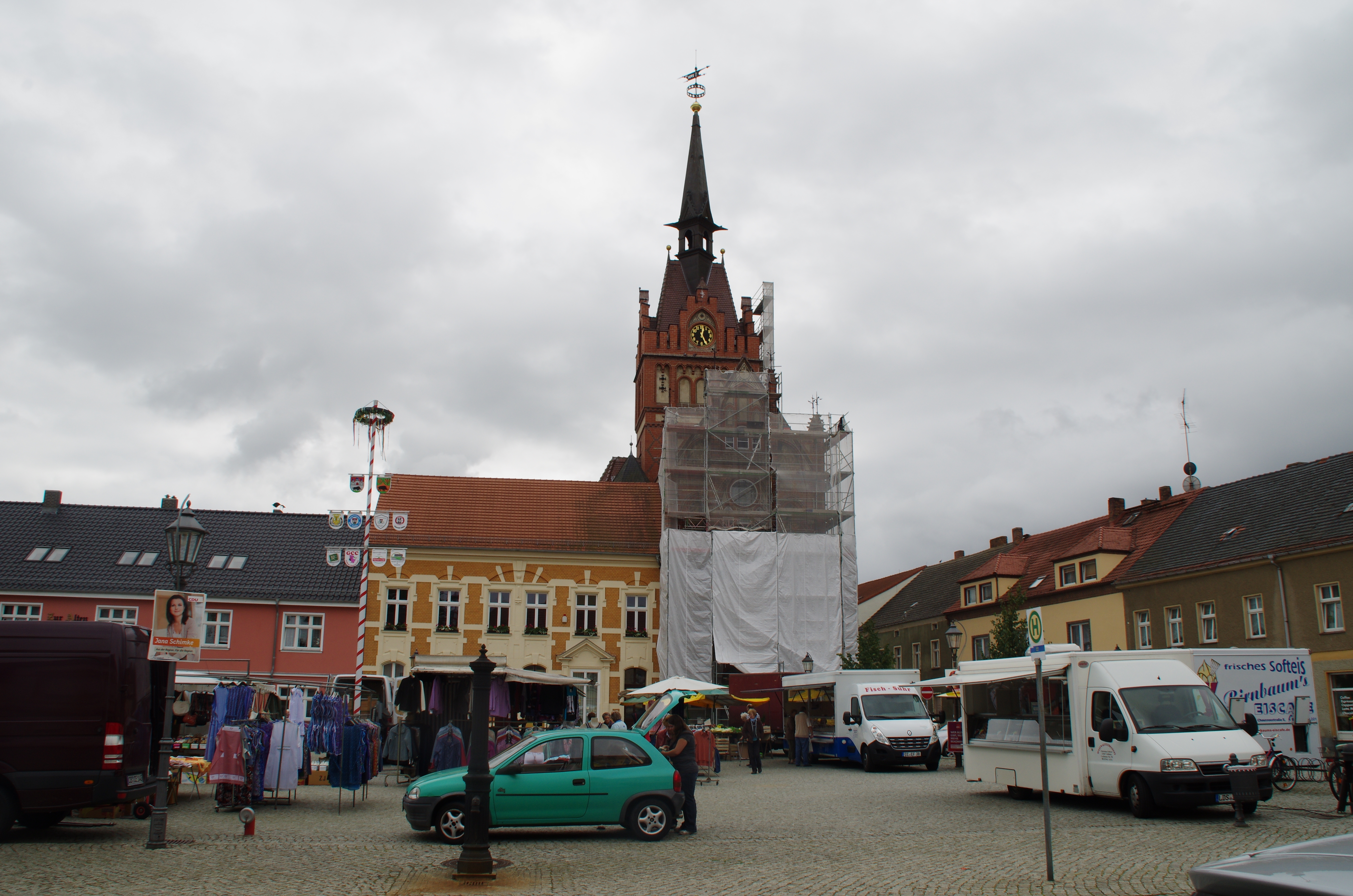
- Market square and town hall

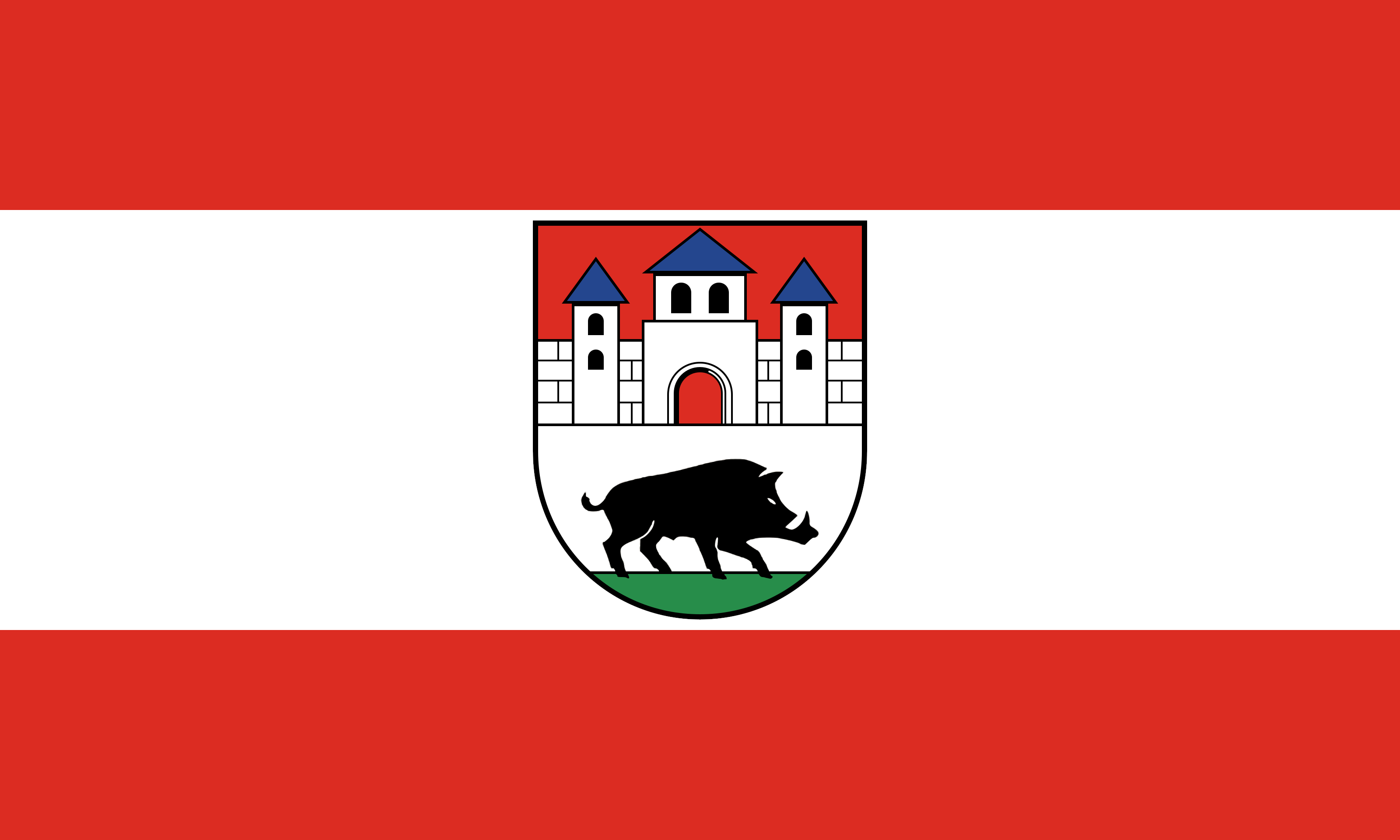
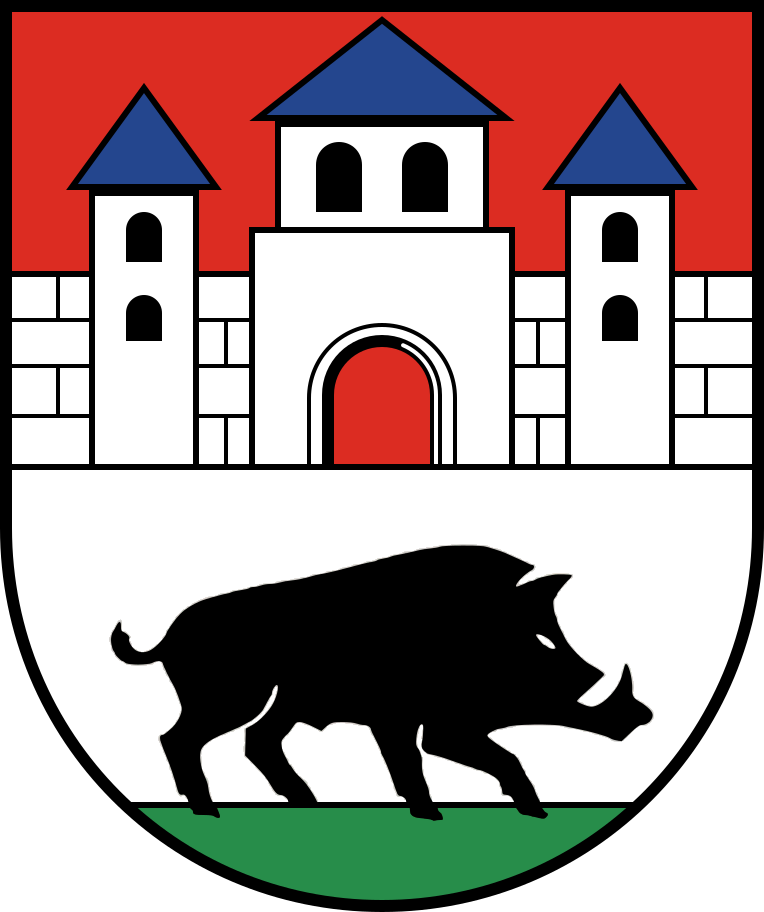
- Flag Coat of arms

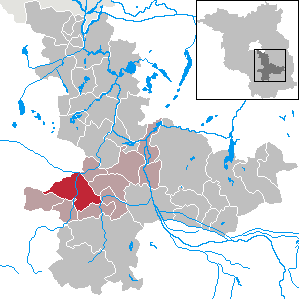
- Location of Golßen within Dahme-Spreewald district
- Interactive map of Golßen
- Location within Germany Location within Brandenburg
- Coordinates: 51°58′N 13°36′E
- Country: Germany
- State: Brandenburg
- District: Dahme-Spreewald
- Municipal assoc.: Unterspreewald
- Subdivisions: 8 Ortsteile

Government
  - Mayor (2024–29): Andrea Schulz

Area
  - Total: 63.68 km^{2} (24.59 sq mi)
- Elevation: 58 m (190 ft)

Population (2025-12-31)
  - Total: 2,415
  - Density: 37.92/km^{2} (98.22/sq mi)
- Time zone: UTC+01:00 (CET)
  - Summer (DST): UTC+02:00 (CEST)
- Postal codes: 15938
- Dialling codes: 035452
- Vehicle registration: LDS

Golßen (German pronunciation: [ˈɡɔlsn̩]; Lower Sorbian: Gólišyn) or Golssen is a town in the district of Dahme-Spreewald, in Brandenburg, Germany. It is the administrative seat of the Amt ("collective municipality") Unterspreewald.

== Geography ==
Golßen is in the northwest of Lower Lusatia, close to the border with the Brandenburgian Mittelmark core territory. The municipal area stretches from the eastern (Lower) Fläming Heath down to the Glogau-Baruth Urstromtal (glacial valley), traversed by the Dahme River. It also comprises the villages of Mahlsdorf and Zützen.

Golßen station is a stop on the Berlin–Dresden railway line. The area around the town is known for the cultivation of Spreewald gherkins.

== History ==
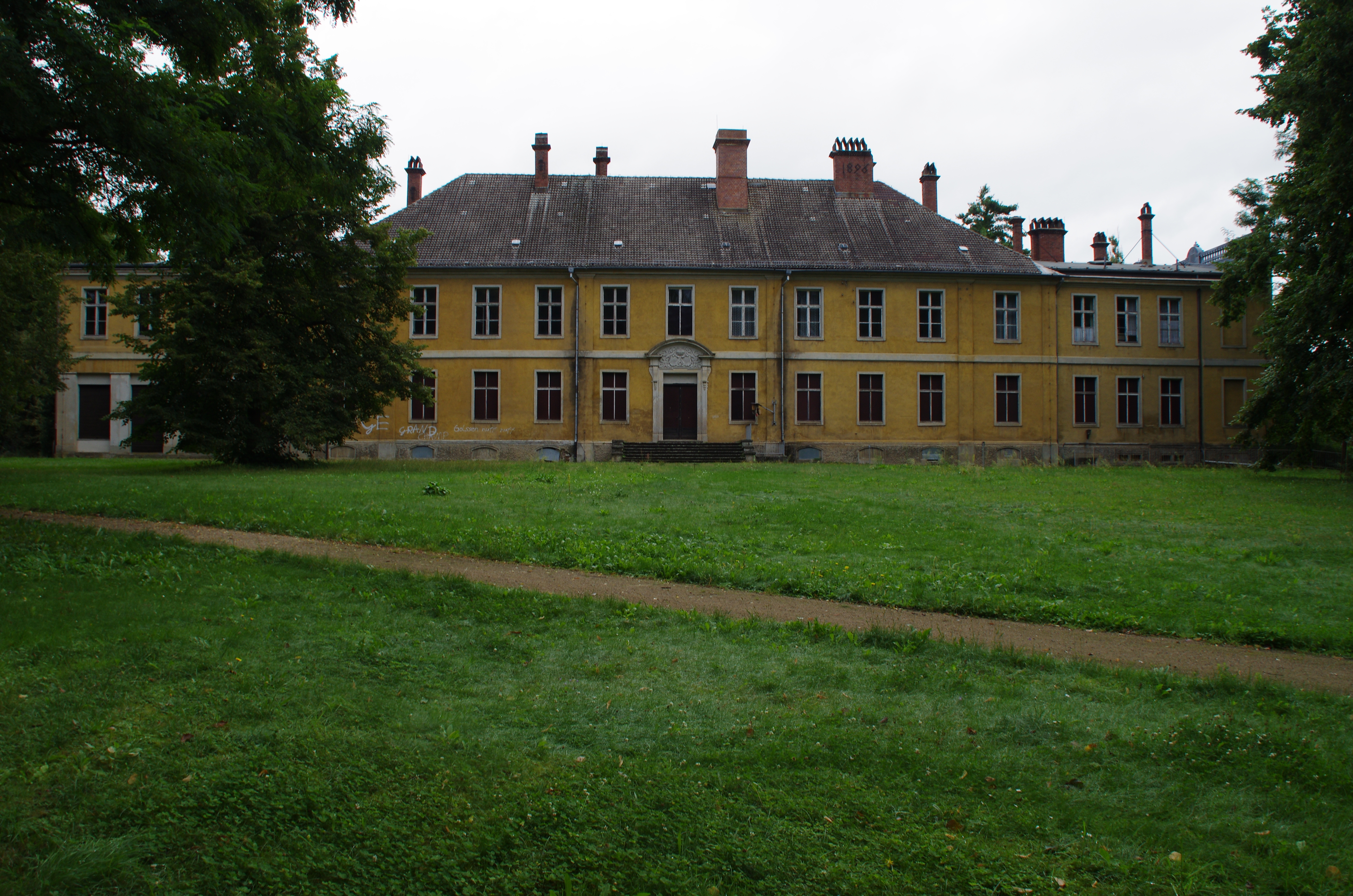
Golßen Castle, 2013 condition

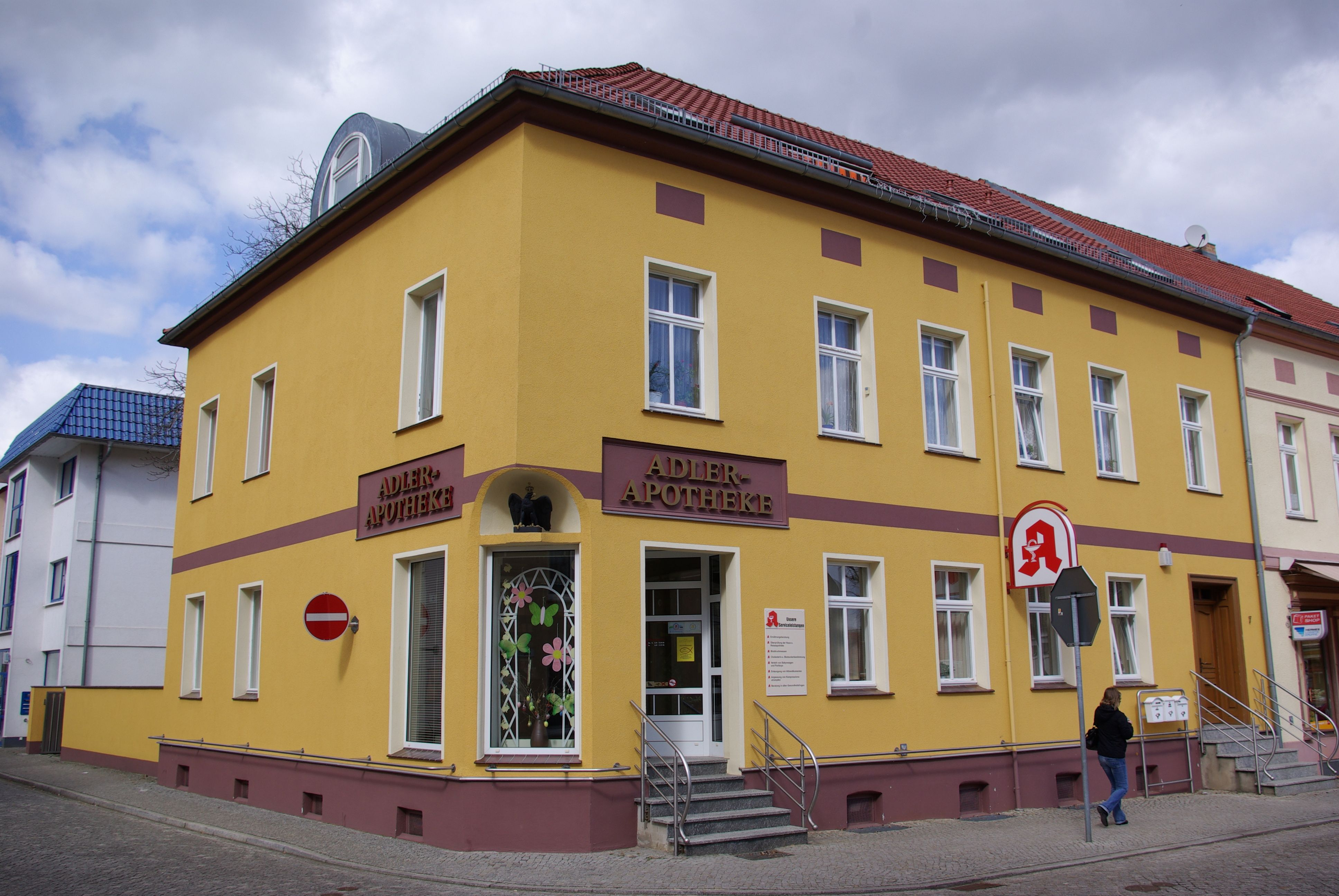
Golßen pharmacy

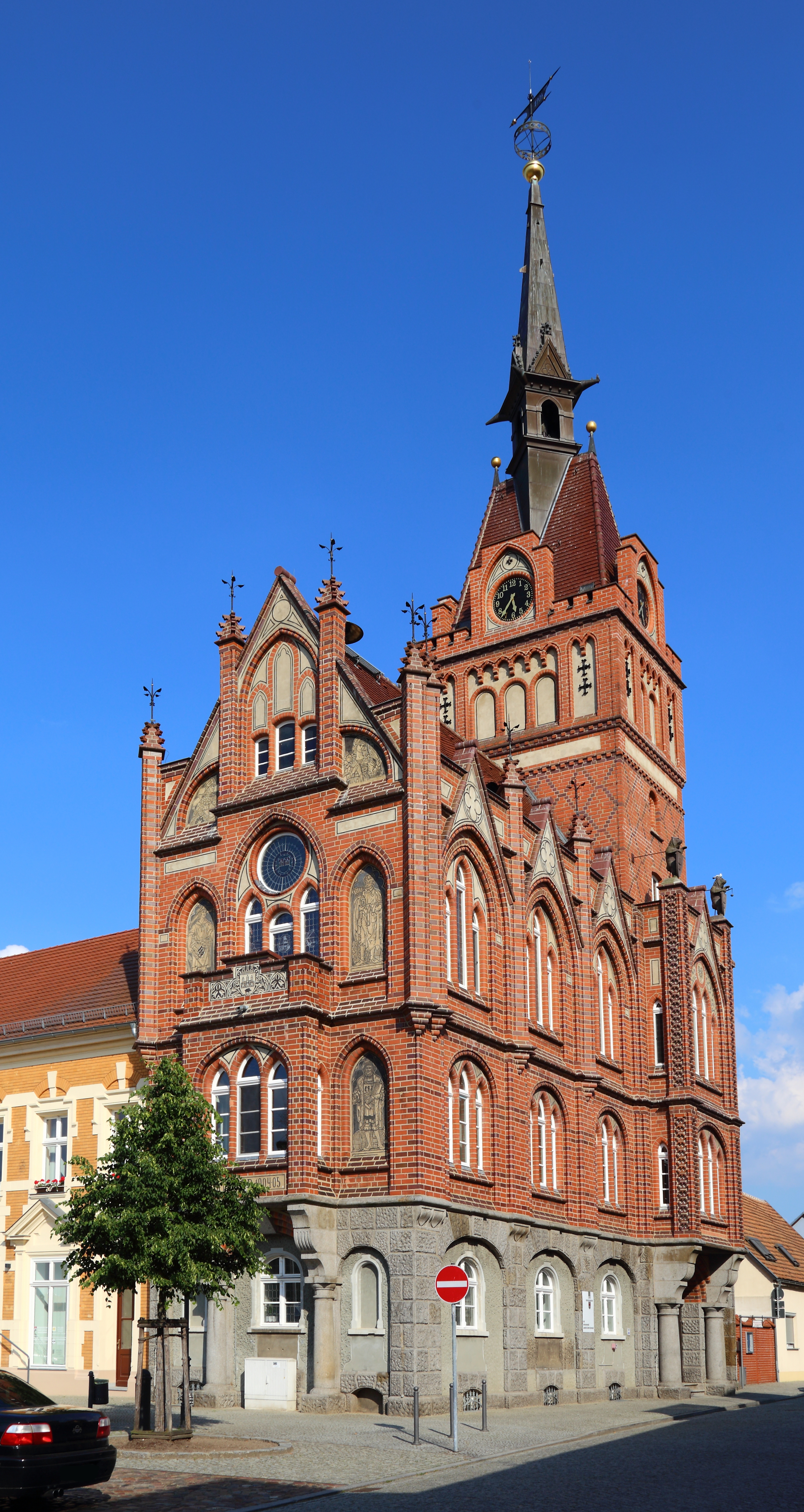
Golßen Town hall

The settlement arose in the course of the German Ostsiedlung eastward migration during the 11th century, possibly at the site of an earlier Slavic village of fortress. Golsyn in the March of Lusatia was first mentioned in a 1276 deed issued by the Wettin margraves. With the former march, Golßen was purchased by the Luxembourg emperor Charles IV in 1367 and incorporated into the Lands of the Bohemian Crown. The Bohemian kings temporarily put the estates around Golßen Castle in pawn to several holders, such as Margrave William I of Meissen (in 1395).

During the Thirty Years' War, the Lusatias again passed to the Wettin electors of Saxony by the 1635 Peace of Prague. Golßen Castle was built about 1723, it passed to the Counts of Solms-Baruth in the 19th century. Surrounded by extended gardens, parts of the buildings were refurbished in a Neoclassical style by Eduard Knoblauch in 1852. The neighbouring estates of Zützen were held by the Kleist noble family. A Baroque palace in Zützen, erected according to plans designed by Georg Wenzeslaus von Knobelsdorff, burnt down completely in the late days of World War II.

After the Napoleonic Wars, Golßen was incorporated into the Prussian province of Brandenburg in 1816.

== Demography ==
Development of population since 1875 within the current boundaries (Blue line: Population; Dotted line: Comparison to population development of Brandenburg state; Grey background: Time of Nazi rule; Red background: Time of communist rule)

Golßen: Population development
within the current boundaries (2020)

Year	Pop.	±% p.a.
1875	2,994	—
1890	3,243	+0.53%
1910	3,015	−0.36%
1925	2,998	−0.04%
1933	2,893	−0.44%
1939	2,840	−0.31%
1946	4,263	+5.97%
1950	4,175	−0.52%
1964	3,400	−1.46%
1971	3,349	−0.22%
1981	3,115	−0.72%
1985	3,112	−0.02%
1989	3,103	−0.07%
1990	3,125	+0.71%
1991	3,092	−1.06%

Year	Pop.	±% p.a.
1992	3,056	−1.16%
1993	3,053	−0.10%
1994	3,015	−1.24%
1995	2,995	−0.66%
1996	3,003	+0.27%
1997	2,956	−1.57%
1998	3,005	+1.66%
1999	3,025	+0.67%
2000	2,994	−1.02%
2001	2,938	−1.87%
2002	2,923	−0.51%
2003	2,868	−1.88%
2004	2,852	−0.56%
2005	2,817	−1.23%
2006	2,746	−2.52%

Year	Pop.	±% p.a.
2007	2,730	−0.58%
2008	2,661	−2.53%
2009	2,627	−1.28%
2010	2,616	−0.42%
2011	2,554	−2.37%
2012	2,532	−0.86%
2013	2,532	+0.00%
2014	2,505	−1.07%
2015	2,567	+2.48%
2016	2,575	+0.31%
2017	2,553	−0.85%
2018	2,542	−0.43%
2019	2,509	−1.30%
2020	2,507	−0.08%

== Politics ==
Seats in the municipal assembly (Stadtverordnetenversammlung) as of the 2019 local elections:

- Independent Citizen's List Golßen : 5
- Social Democratic Party of Germany (SPD): 5
- Alternative for Germany: 4
- Christian Democratic Union: 2

The mayor in Golßen is Daniela Maurer (SPD).

== Notable people ==
- Johann Eberhard von Droste zu Zützen (1662-1726), Saxon general, commander of the fortress Königstein, and landlord
- Knut Hickethier (born 1945), media scientist
- Alfred Hoffmann (born 1958), Catholic clergyman
