= Kasel-Golzig =

- Municipality
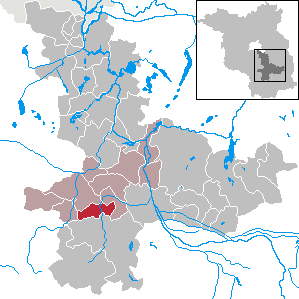
- Location of Kasel-Golzig within Dahme-Spreewald district
- Interactive map of Kasel-Golzig
- Location within Germany Location within Brandenburg
- Coordinates: 51°56′N 13°42′E
- Country: Germany
- State: Brandenburg
- District: Dahme-Spreewald
- Municipal assoc.: Unterspreewald
- Subdivisions: 3 Ortsteile

Government
  - Mayor (2024–29): Stefan Eghbalian

Area
  - Total: 34.25 km^{2} (13.22 sq mi)
- Elevation: 56 m (184 ft)

Population (2025-12-31)
  - Total: 678
  - Density: 19.8/km^{2} (51.3/sq mi)
- Time zone: UTC+01:00 (CET)
  - Summer (DST): UTC+02:00 (CEST)
- Postal codes: 15938
- Dialling codes: 035452
- Vehicle registration: LDS

Kasel-Golzig (Lower Sorbian: Kózłow-Gólsk) is a municipality in the district of Dahme-Spreewald in Brandenburg in Germany.

== Demography ==
Development of population since 1875 within the current boundaries (Blue line: Population; Dotted line: Comparison to population development of Brandenburg state; Grey background: Time of Nazi rule; Red background: Time of communist rule)

Kasel-Golzig: Population development
within the current boundaries (2017)

Year	Pop.	±% p.a.
1875	943	—
1890	934	−0.06%
1910	803	−0.75%
1925	961	+1.20%
1933	897	−0.86%
1939	840	−1.09%
1946	1,290	+6.32%
1950	1,232	−1.14%
1964	1,016	−1.37%
1971	1,003	−0.18%
1981	915	−0.91%
1985	906	−0.25%
1989	859	−1.32%
1990	828	−3.61%

Year	Pop.	±% p.a.
1991	808	−2.42%
1992	809	+0.12%
1993	800	−1.11%
1994	811	+1.37%
1995	803	−0.99%
1996	808	+0.62%
1997	809	+0.12%
1998	826	+2.10%
1999	826	+0.00%
2000	834	+0.97%
2001	794	−4.80%
2002	780	−1.76%
2003	776	−0.51%
2004	791	+1.93%

Year	Pop.	±% p.a.
2005	779	−1.52%
2006	772	−0.90%
2007	779	+0.91%
2008	764	−1.93%
2009	746	−2.36%
2010	733	−1.74%
2011	748	+2.05%
2012	745	−0.40%
2013	685	−8.05%
2014	673	−1.75%
2015	685	+1.78%
2016	684	−0.15%
2017	690	+0.88%
