= Unterspreewald (Amt) =

- Amt
- Map of Dahme-Spreewald highlighting Unterspreewald
- Interactive map of Unterspreewald
- Location within Germany Location within Brandenburg
- Coordinates: 51°59′N 13°40′E
- Country: Germany
- State: Brandenburg
- District: Dahme-Spreewald
- Seat: Golßen
- Subdivisions: 10 municipalities

Area
  - Total: 380.95 km^{2} (147.09 sq mi)

Population (2025-12-31)
  - Total: 8,921
  - Density: 23.42/km^{2} (60.65/sq mi)
- Time zone: UTC+01:00 (CET)
  - Summer (DST): UTC+02:00 (CEST)
- Website: www.unterspreewald.de

Amt Unterspreewald is an Amt ("collective municipality") in the district of Dahme-Spreewald, in Brandenburg, Germany. Its seat is in the town Golßen.

The Amt Unterspreewald consists of the following municipalities:

1. Bersteland
2. Drahnsdorf
3. Golßen
4. Kasel-Golzig
5. Krausnick-Groß Wasserburg
6. Rietzneuendorf-Staakow
7. Schlepzig
8. Schönwald
9. Steinreich
10. Unterspreewald

== Demography ==
Development of Population since 1875 within the Current Boundaries (Blue Line: Population; Dotted Line: Comparison to Population Development of Brandenburg state; Grey Background: Time of Nazi rule; Red Background: Time of Communist rule)

Recent Population Development and Projections (Population Development before Census 2011 (blue line); Recent Population Development according to the Census in Germany in 2011 (blue bordered line); Official projections for 2005-2030 (yellow line); for 2017-2030 (scarlet line); for 2020-2030 (green line)

Amt Unterspreewald: Population development
within the current boundaries (2020)

Year	Pop.	±% p.a.
1875	13,071	—
1890	13,267	+0.10%
1910	11,887	−0.55%
1925	12,035	+0.08%
1939	11,590	−0.27%
1950	16,024	+2.99%
1964	12,758	−1.61%
1971	12,334	−0.48%
1981	11,208	−0.95%

Year	Pop.	±% p.a.
1985	11,002	−0.46%
1990	10,733	−0.49%
1995	10,651	−0.15%
2000	10,328	−0.61%
2005	9,905	−0.83%
2010	9,379	−1.09%
2015	9,078	−0.65%
2020	8,987	−0.20%
2025	8,921	−0.15%
