= Dahme-Spreewald =

Coordinates: 52°2′N 13°54′E

- District
- Flag Coat of arms
- Country: Germany
- State: Brandenburg
- Capital: Lübben

Government
  - District admin.: Sven Herzberger

Area
  - Total: 2,261 km^{2} (873 sq mi)

Population (31 December 2025)
  - Total: 179,480
  - Density: 79.38/km^{2} (205.6/sq mi)
- Time zone: UTC+01:00 (CET)
  - Summer (DST): UTC+02:00 (CEST)
- Vehicle registration: LDS, KW, LC, LN
- Website: dahme-spreewald.de

Dahme-Spreewald (Lower Sorbian: Wokrejs Damna-Błota, pronounced [ˈwɔkrɛjs ˈdamna ˈbwɔta]) is a district in Brandenburg, Germany. It is bounded by (from the east and clockwise) the districts of Oder-Spree, Spree-Neiße, Oberspreewald-Lausitz, Elbe-Elster and Teltow-Fläming, and by the city of Berlin.

== History ==
The Spreewald region has always been a centre of Sorbian culture. In medieval times the cities of Lübben and Luckau had successively been capitals of the margravate of Lower Lusatia. From 1815 on Lower Lusatia was a part of Prussia. Throughout the 19th century the region remained an agriculturally used area, some urbanisation taking place in the very north (close to Berlin) only.

When the state of Brandenburg was newly founded in 1990, the districts of Lübben, Luckau and Königs Wusterhausen had been established. In 1993 the three districts were merged.

== Geography ==
The Spree river enters the district in the southeast and leaves to the northeast. The wooded regions along its banks are called Spreewald. The Spreewald is the westernmost part of Lusatia. Especially the cities of Lübben and Lübbenau welcome many tourists each year, offering boat trips and holidays in the Spreewald nature.

The Dahme river is a tributary of the Spree. It forms many lakes in the northern part of the district. The Dahme leaves the district towards Berlin, where it is occasionally used for boat races. Eventually, it joins the Spree.

== Demography ==
Development of Population since 1875 within the Current Boundaries (Blue Line: Population; Dotted Line: Comparison to Population Development of Brandenburg state)

Recent Population Development and Projections (Population Development before Census 2011 (blue line); Recent Population Development according to the Census in Germany in 2011 (blue bordered line); Official projections for 2005-2030 (yellow line); for 2014-2030 (red line); for 2017-2030 (scarlet line)

Landkreis Dahme-Spreewald: Population development
within the current boundaries (2025)

Year	Pop.	±% p.a.
1875	83,381	—
1890	87,772	+0.34%
1910	103,543	+0.83%
1925	109,281	+0.36%
1933	120,359	+1.21%
1939	137,972	+2.30%
1946	162,990	+2.41%
1950	161,884	−0.17%
1964	151,847	−0.46%
1971	151,350	−0.05%

Year	Pop.	±% p.a.
1981	148,279	−0.20%
1985	147,508	−0.13%
1990	142,899	−0.63%
1995	144,990	+0.29%
2000	158,994	+1.86%
2005	161,937	+0.37%
2010	161,805	−0.02%
2015	164,528	+0.33%
2020	173,316	+1.05%
2025	179,480	+0.70%

== Coat of arms ==
The coat of arms displays:

- top left: the bull is the heraldic animal of Lusatia
- top right: the eagle is the heraldic animal of Brandenburg
- bottom: the crown symbolises the former hunting lodge of the Prussian kings, which was in Königs Wusterhausen

== Towns and municipalities ==
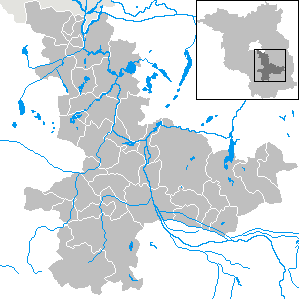
Clickable map of towns and municipalities in the district

Amt-free towns	Ämter
1. Königs Wusterhausen; 2. Lübben (Spreewald) – Lubin; 3. Luckau; 4. Mittenwalde; 5. Wildau; Amt-free municipalities: 1. Bestensee; 2. Eichwalde; 3. Heideblick; 4. Heidesee; 5. Märkische Heide; 6. Schönefeld; 7. Schulzendorf; 8. Zeuthen	1. Lieberose/Oberspreewald; 1. Alt Zauche-Wußwerk – Stara Niwa-Wózwjerch; 2. Byhleguhre-Byhlen – Běła Góra-Bělin; 3. Jamlitz; 4. Lieberose^{1, 2}; 5. Neu Zauche – Nowa Niwa; 6. Schwielochsee; 7. Spreewaldheide; 8. Straupitz – Tšupc; 2. Schenkenländchen; 1. Groß Köris; 2. Halbe; 3. Märkisch Buchholz^{2}; 4. Münchehofe; 5. Schwerin; 6. Teupitz^{1, 2}	3. Unterspreewald; 1. Bersteland; 2. Drahnsdorf; 3. Golßen^{1, 2}; 4. Kasel-Golzig; 5. Krausnick-Groß Wasserburg; 6. Rietzneuendorf-Staakow; 7. Schlepzig; 8. Schönwald; 9. Steinreich; 10. Unterspreewald
^{1}seat of the Amt; ^{2}town
