= Sorbian settlement area =

Linguistic minority settlement area

Sorbian settlement area German: Sorbisches Siedlungsgebiet Upper Sorbian: Serbski sydlenski rum Lower Sorbian: Serbski sedleński rum
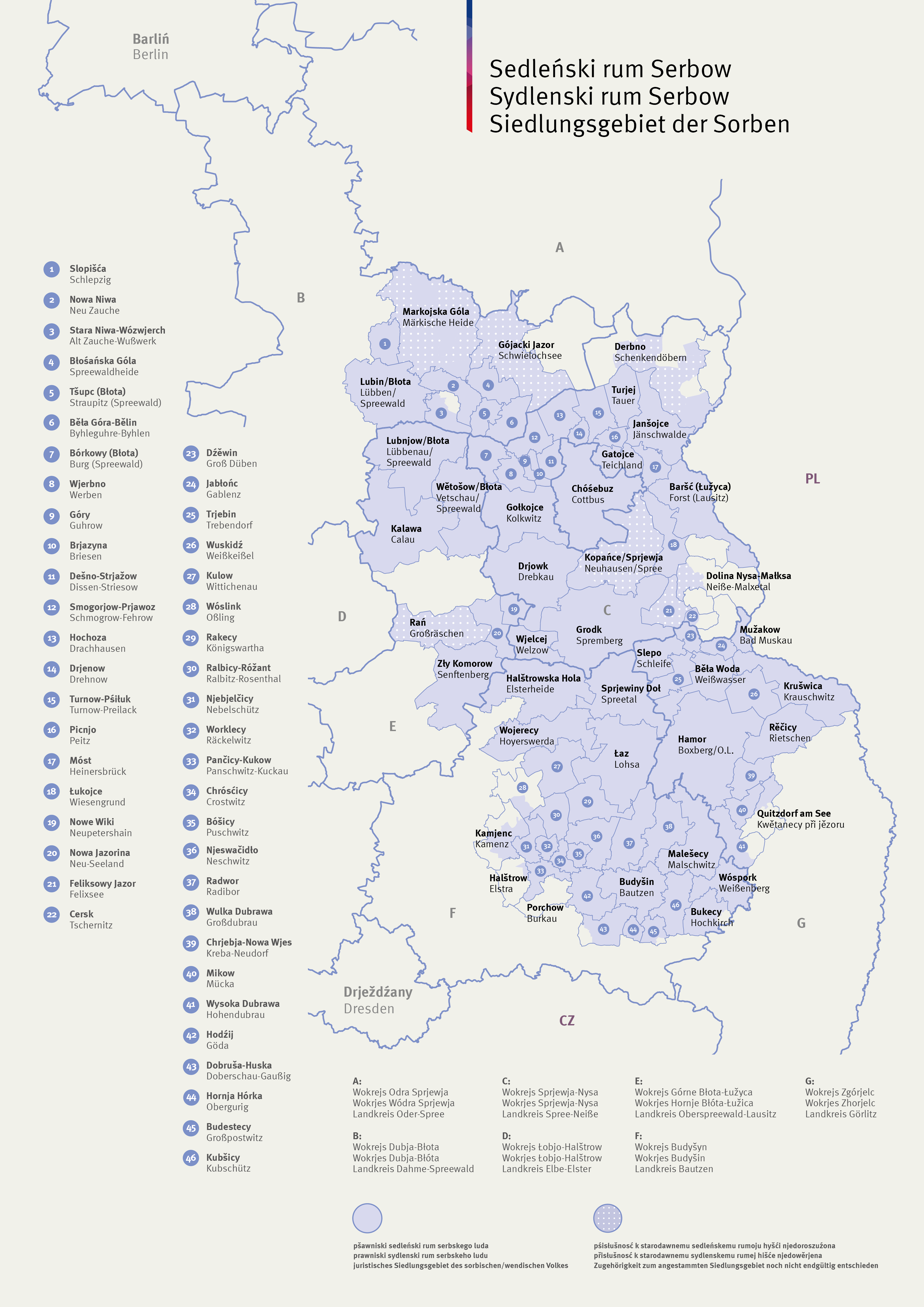
- Country: Germany
- State: Saxony; Brandenburg

The Sorbian settlement area (Lower Sorbian: Serbski sedleński rum [ˈsɛrpskʲi ˈsɛdlɛnʲskʲi ˈrum], Upper Sorbian: Serbski sydlenski rum [ˈsɛʁpskʲi ˈsɨdlɛnskʲi ˈʁum], German: Sorbisches Siedlungsgebiet; in Brandenburg officially Siedlungsgebiet der Sorben/Wenden) commonly makes reference to the area in the east of Saxony and the South of Brandenburg in which the West Slavic people of the Sorbs (in Brandenburg also called "Wends") live autochthonously. In colloquial German, it is called Sorbenland (Land of the Sorbs); before 1945 also – sometimes pejoratively – called Wendei.

This area was reduced constantly during the centuries due to assimilation, Germanization and strip mining lignite. Additionally, the identification as Sorb is free under federal and state law and cannot be verified. Therefore, different approaches on defining who belongs to the Sorbian people exist. Identifying Sorbs are not in the majority in most of the Sorbian settlement area, but rather a – in part very small – minority.

== Officially recognized settlement area ==
The officially recognized settlement area, so called "angestammtes Siedlungsgebiet" in German, is defined in laws and regulations of the States of Saxony and Brandenburg.

In Saxony it is permanently defined by the Gesetz über die Rechte der Sorben im Freistaat Sachsen (Law on the rights of the Sorbs in the Free State of Saxony). It is based on the statistics by Arnošt Muka from the 1880s in order to preserve and protect the settlement area in its historical dimensions. In some eastern parts of the settlement area (Landkreis Görlitz), Sorbian is nowadays almost absent from public life.

The Gesetz über die Ausgestaltung der Rechte der Sorben/Wenden im Land Brandenburg (Law on the definition of the rights of Sorbs/Wends in the State of Brandenburg) required municipalities considering themselves part of the settlement area to prove the continuation of linguistic and cultural presence of Sorbian (Wendish) tradition. This requirement was harshly criticized by minority rights activists and representatives of the Sorbs as the accession to the settlement area depended on the good will of the municipalities and thus undermining the principle of minority rights protection. Additionally, they protested that, due to the stricter assimilation politics and oppression of the Sorbs in Prussia, the continuing linguistical and cultural tradition is hard to attest. After being amended in 2014, the corroborating Sorbian linguistic or cultural tradition is sufficient. The accession to the settlement area can also be requested by the Council for Sorbian/Wendish Affaires.

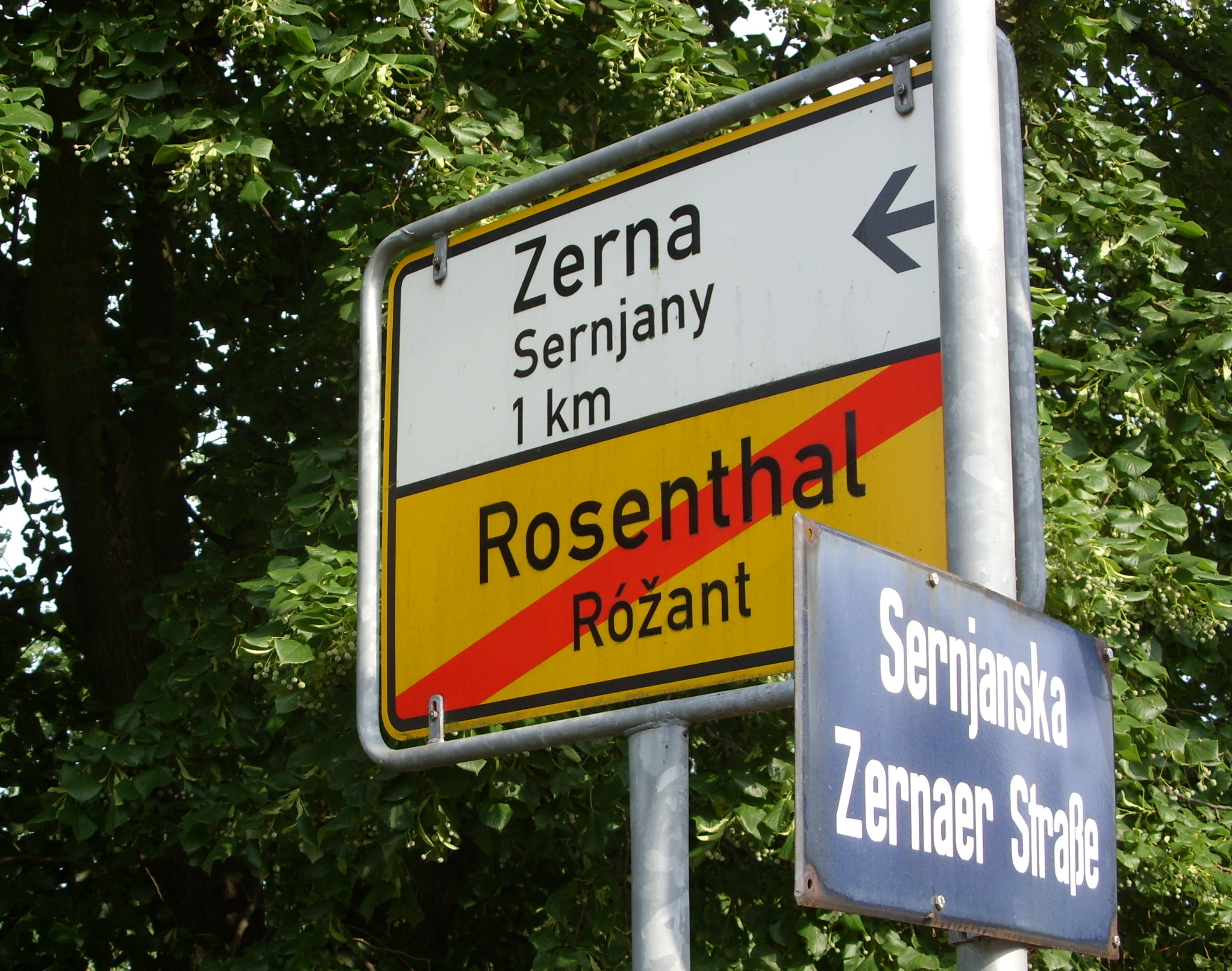
Bilingual town sign and bilingual street name sign

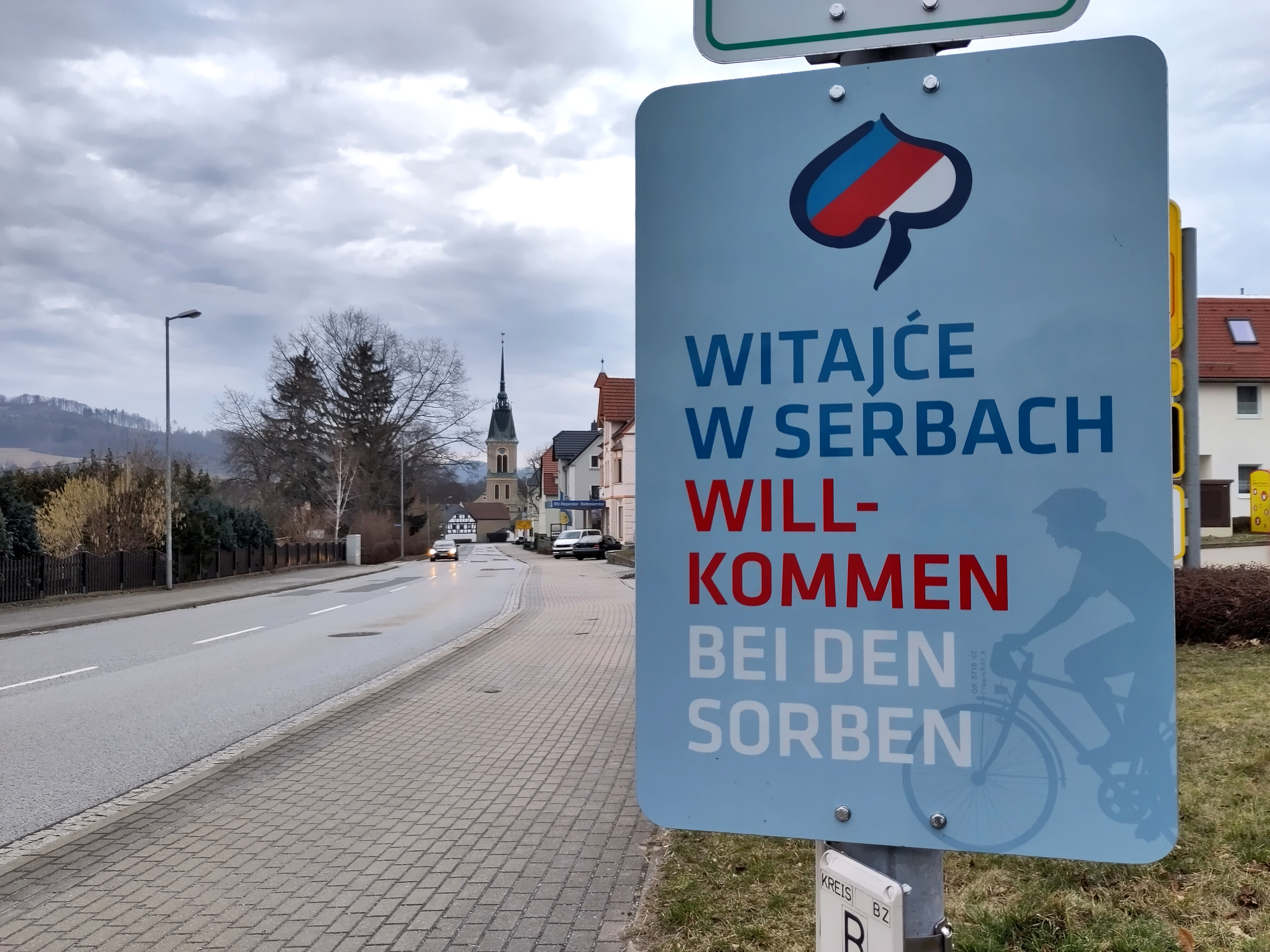
Welcome sign in Großpostwitz on the southern edge of the official settlement area

The municipalities and local clubs in the settlement area are responsible for promotion and development of the Sorbian language and culture. They ought to install bilingual street name signs, offer bilingual websites, and guarantee public presence of the language. Town and guide signs are already mandatorily bilingual. Nonetheless, outside the core settlement area (see below), those requirements are rarely fulfilled. Since the New Law on Sorbs and Wends came into operation in Brandenburg in 2014, all municipalities in the settlement area officially have German-Lower Sorbian double name.

The area comprises the following municipalities and quarters:

- in Saxony:
  - Landkreis Bautzen (28 of 59 municipalities): Bautzen/Budyšin, Burkau (only Neuhof/Nowy Dwór), Crostwitz/Chrósćicy, Doberschau-Gaußig/Dobruša-Huska (except Cossern and Naundorf), Elsterheide/Halštrowska Hola, Elstra (only Kriepitz/Krěpjecy), Göda/Hodźij, Großdubrau/Wulka Dubrawa, Großpostwitz/Budestecy (except Eulowitz), Hochkirch/Bukecy (except Breitendorf), Hoyerswerda/Wojerecy, Kamenz/Kamjenc (Deutschbaselitz/Němske Pazlicy, Jesau/Jěžow, Kamenz/Kamjenc, Thonberg/Hlinowc, Wiesa/Brěznja), Königswartha/Rakecy, Kubschütz/Kubšicy, Lohsa/Łaz, Malschwitz/Malešecy, Nebelschütz/Njebjelčicy, Neschwitz/Njeswačidło, Obergurig/Hornja Hórka, Oßling (only Milstrich/Jitro), Panschwitz-Kuckau/Pančicy-Kukow, Puschwitz/Bóšicy, Räckelwitz/Worklecy, Radibor/Radwor, Ralbitz-Rosenthal/Ralbicy-Róžant, Spreetal/Sprjewiny Doł, Weißenberg/Wóspork and Wittichenau/Kulow
  - Landkreis Görlitz (14 of 53 municipalities): Bad Muskau/Mužakow, Boxberg/Hamor, Gablenz/Jabłońc, Groß Düben/Dźěwin, Hohendubrau/Wysoka Dubrawa (except Groß Radisch, Jerchwitz, Thräna), Krauschwitz/Krušwica, Kreba-Neudorf/Chrjebja-Nowa Wjes, Mücka/Mikow, Quitzdorf am See (only Horscha/Hóršow and Petershain/Hóznica), Rietschen/Rěčicy, Schleife/Slepo, Trebendorf/Trjebin, Weißkeißel/Wuskidź and Weißwasser/Běła Woda
- in Brandenburg:
  - City of Cottbus/Chóśebuz
  - Landkreis Spree-Neiße (23 of 29 municipalities): Burg/Bórkowy, Briesen/Brjazyna, Dissen-Striesow/Dešno-Strjažow, Drachhausen/Hochoza, Drebkau/Drjowk, Drehnow/Drjenow, Felixsee/Feliksowy Jazor (only Bloischdorf/Błobošojce), Forst/Baršć, Guhrow/Góry, Heinersbrück/Móst, Jänschwalde/Janšojce, Kolkwitz/Gołkojce, Neuhausen/Kopańce (Quarters of Haasow/Hažow and Groß Döbbern/Wjelike Dobrynje), Peitz/Picnjo, Schenkendöbern/Derbno (quarters of Grano/Granow, Kerkwitz/Keŕkojce, Groß Gastrose/Wjeliki Gósćeraz, Taubendorf/Dubojce), Schmogrow-Fehrow/Smogorjow-Prjawoz, Spremberg/Grodk, Tauer/Turjej, Teichland/Gatojce, Turnow-Preilack/Turnow-Pśiłuk, Welzow/Wjelcej, Werben/Wjerbno, and Wiesengrund/Łukojce
  - Landkreis Dahme-Spreewald (7 of 37 municipalities): Byhleguhre-Byhlen/Běła Góra-Bělin, Lübben/Lubin, Märkische Heide/Markojska Góla (Quarters of Dollgen/Dołgi, Groß Leuthen/Lutol, Klein Leine/Małe Linje, Pretschen/Mrocna), Neu Zauche/Nowa Niwa, Schlepzig/Slopišća, Spreewaldheide/Błośańska Góla and Straupitz/Tšupc
  - Landkreis Oberspreewald-Lausitz (6 of 25 municipalities): Calau/Kalawa, Lübbenau/Lubnjow, Neupetershain/Nowe Wiki, Neu-Seeland/Nowa Jazorina, Senftenberg/Zły Komorow, Vetschau/Wětošow
  - The following municipalities and quarters, since 2016, are recognized by the Landtag and Government of Brandenburg as part of the settlement area, despite them suing for their unrecognition: Alt Zauche-Wußwerk/Stara Niwa-Wózwjerch, Döbern/Derbno, Felixsee/Feliksowy Jazor (other quarters), Großräschen/Rań, Märkische Heide/Markojska Góla (other quarters), Neiße-Malxetal/Dolina Nyse a Małkse (quarters of Groß Kölzig/Wjeliki Kólsk and Klein Kölzig/Mały Kólsk), Neuhausen/Kopańce (other quarters), Schenkendöbern/Derbno (quarters of Bärenklau/Barklawa, Grabko/Grabkow, Pinnow/Pynow and Schenkendöbern/Derbno), Schwielochsee/Gójacki Jazor, Tschernitz/Cersk

== Historical settlement area ==
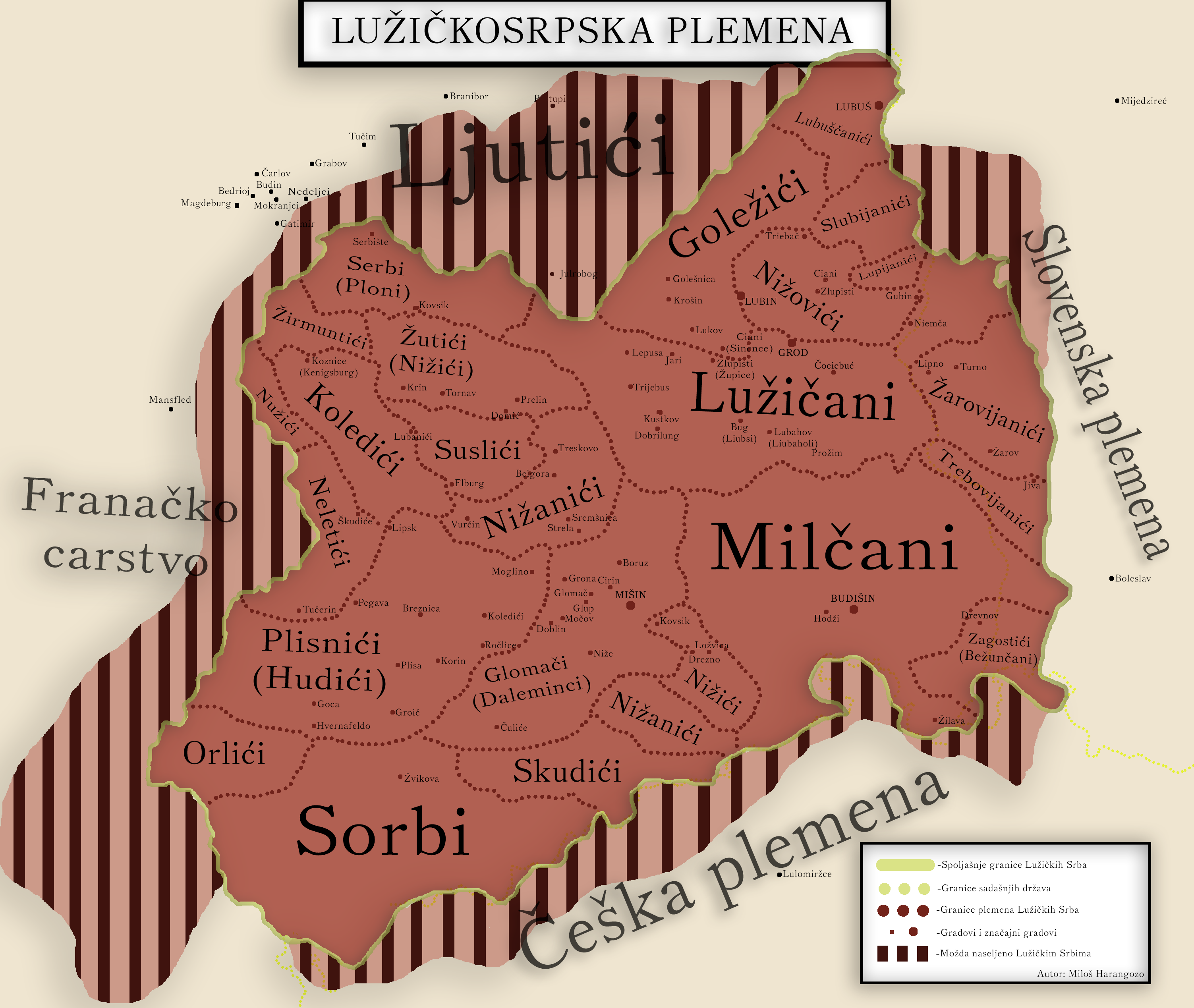
The Lusitia-Serbian tribes

The historical settlement area depends on the century and which West Slavs are considered Sorbs.

=== Early and medieval history ===
In the 6th century CE, West Slavic tribes, called Lusatian Serbians, settled in the modern day region of Saxony and Southern Brandenburg. A lot of place names in Saxony are of Sorbian providence, p.e., Dresden, Leipzig, Meißen, Chemnitz or Torgau. German kings began conquering the area in the 10th century. About a century later, the West Slavic language of the local population started to develop into Sorbian. From then on, little evidence of the Sorbian language can be found. One example comes from Martin Luther in early 16th century, who expressed negative opinions about the Sorbian population of the villages around Wittenberg. Another lead is that there were prohibitions on the Sorbian language in some cities (1327 in Leipzig, 1377 in Altenburg, Zwickau, and Chemnitz). In the northeast, the Sorbian settlement area bordered the Polish one, in the region of Crossen and Sorau. The Sorbian language was also spoken in some villages east of the rivers Bóbr and Oder until the 17th century CE.

=== 19th century ===
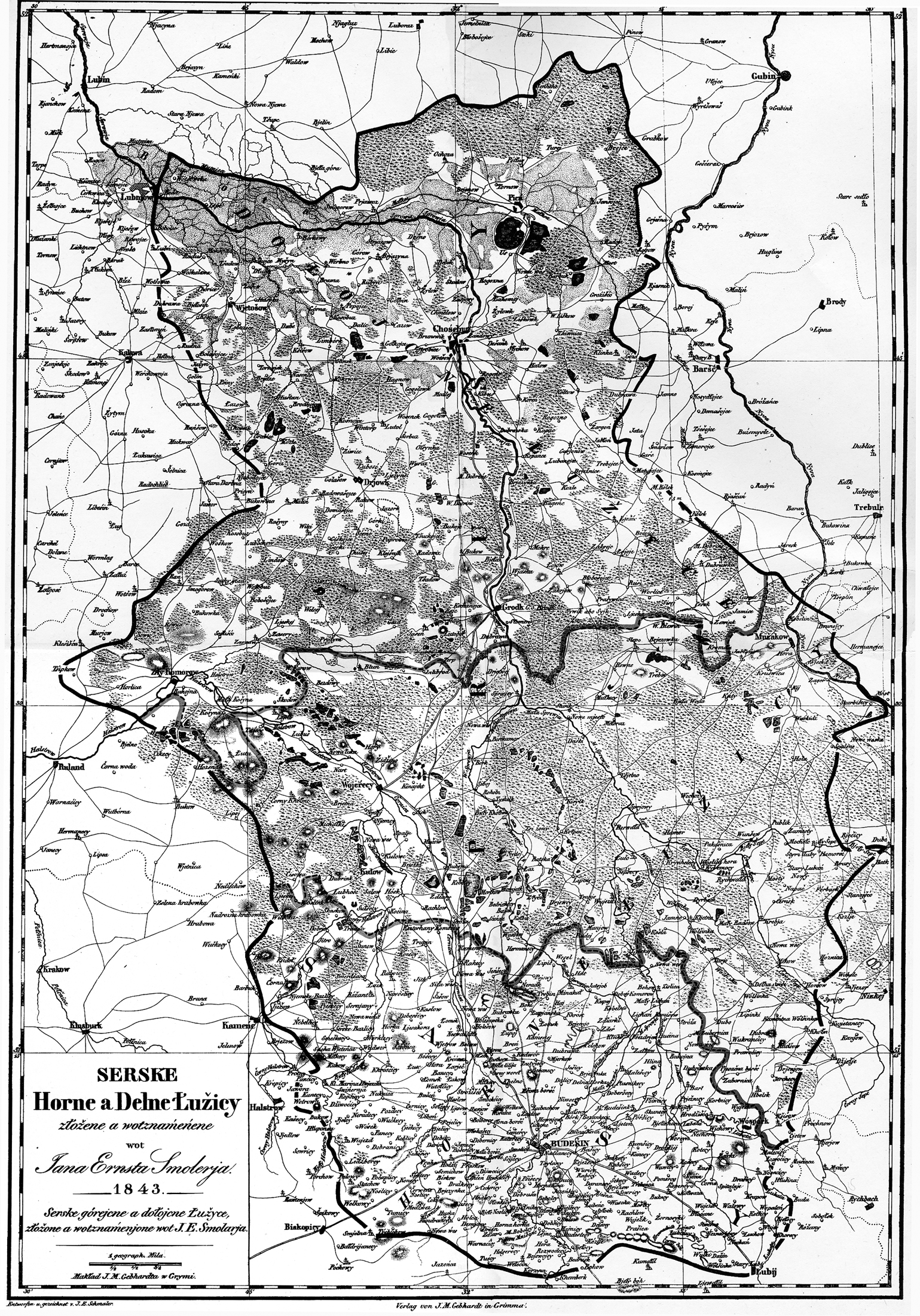
Settlement area according to Smoler 1843. 40 years later, Muka found a larger settlement area.

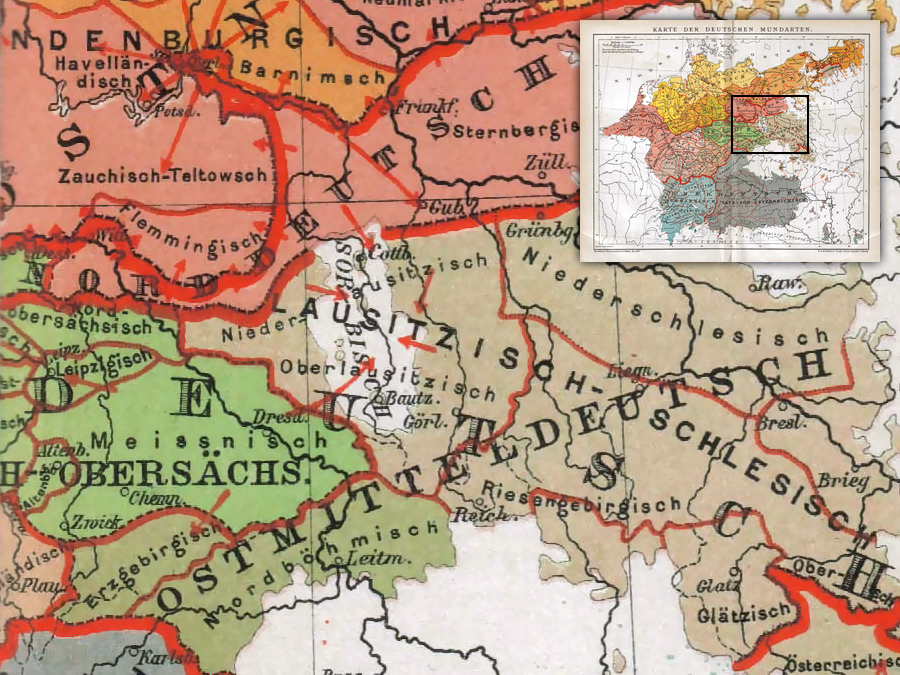
Details from the „Map of German dialects“ (Brockhaus Konversations-Lexikon, 1894): the Sorbian language island was isolated from the wider Slavic language area; German was prevalent in urban areas (Bautzen, Spremberg and Cottbus along the Spree as well as Hoyerswerda and Wittichenau) only.

The first systematic research on the size of the Sorbian settlement area was done by Jan Arnošt Smoler (1843) and later in more detail by Arnošt Muka (1884/85). While Smoler was more interested in collecting folkloric tales, Muka travelled to the municipalities to receive first-hand information about the use of the Sorbian language. Apart from detailed statistics, he wrote down reports about his conversations with locals of those municipalities. Muka found round about 166,000 Sorbs, but also documented the rapid Germanization of Sorbian towns, especially in Lower Lusatia.

== Core settlement area ==
The "Sorbian core settlement area" references the area in which the Sorbian language is still spoken on a daily basis.

This applies to the mostly catholic Upper Lusatia in between Bautzen, Kamenz and Hoyerswerda, more closely the five municipalities of am Klosterwasser and Radibor. In those areas, more than half of the population speaks Upper Sorbian. Upper Sorbian speakers also make up more than a third of the inhabitants of Göda, Neschwitz, Puschwitz and the city of Wittichenau.

For Lower Lusatia, it encompasses the municipalities north of Cottbus (e.g., Drachhausen, Dissen-Striesow, Jänschwalde). However, the Sorbian language is spoken by not more than 15 to 30 percent of the population in those municipalities. Consequently, it is less present in everyday life than in Upper Lusatia.

== Literature ==
- Peter Kunze, Andreas Bensch: Die Sorben / Wenden in der Niederlausitz. Ein geschichtlicher Überblick [The Sorbians in Lower Lusatia. A historical overview]. In: Wobrazki ze Serbow. 2., reviewed edition. Domowina, Bautzen 2000 (first edition 1996). ISBN 3-7420-1668-7.
- Gertraud Eva Schrage: Die Oberlausitz bis zum Jahr 1346 [Upper Lusatia until 1346]. In: Joachim Bahlke (Hrsg.): Geschichte der Oberlausitz [History of Upper Lusatia]. Revised 2nd edition, Leipziger Universitätsverlag, Leipzig 2004 (first edition 2001). ISBN 978-3-935693-46-2, S. 55–97.
- Arnošt Muka: Statistika łužiskich Serbow [Statistics of the Lusatian Sorbs]. Selbstverlag, Budyšin [Bautzen] 1884–1886; 5th edition with the title Serbski zemjepisny słowničk [Sorbian geographic dictionary]. Budyšin 1927; reprint: Domowina, Bautzen 1979.
