= BKG =

BKG or bkg may refer to:

- Branson Airport, the IATA code BKG
- Bundesamt für Kartographie und Geodäsie, Germany's national mapping agency
- bkg, the ISO 639-3 code for Gbanzili language
- Booktopia, the ASX code BKG
- Klinge station, the DS100 code BKG
- Berkeley Group Holdings, the LSE code BKG
- Barking station, the station code BKG
