= Brandenburglied =

Song by Gustav Büchsenschütz

- Traditional Flag of Brandenburg
- Regional anthem of Brandenburg
- Lyrics: Gustav Büchsenschütz
- Music: Gustav Büchsenschütz, 1923
- Adopted: 10 May 1923

The Brandenburglied (German: Märkische Heide, märkischer Sand) (also known under the title of "Märkische Heide", or "Märkish Heath") was a music piece written by “Gustav Büchsenschütz (1902–1996) for the Province of Brandenburg, then within the Kingdom of Prussia of the German Empire.

Märkische Heide is the unofficial anthem of Brandenburg. Composed by Gustav Büchsenschütz in 1923, it was popular in the 1920s and 30s, and is still used today.

It was used in the province from 1920's to 1936.

In present days it is used as unofficial anthem of the German federal state of Brandenburg.

There is an adaptation of this melody by the Chilean Army, which named Mi Fusil y Yo (My rifle and me).

== Origin ==
According to Gustav Büchsenschütz (1902–1996), the song was written and composed by himself on Ascension Day, May 10, 1923. The idea for the song came to him as a member of the Wandervogel movement during an overnight stay in the youth hostel in Neu-Vehlefanz. Apparently he initially kept his authorship secret from the young people to see how they would react. A memorial stone there commemorates this today.

Margarete Seidel from Schöneiche near Berlin, who was interviewed, reports, however, that the text was written by a youth group of the Bismarck League in Berlin-Friedrichshain. Büchsenschütz only contributed the melody to the youth group “Friedrich Wilhelm von Seydlitz”. Its last chorus sequence resembles the Russian workers' song of 1895: Smelo, towarischtschi, w nogu (Brothers, to the sun, to freedom).

== Use in the nationalist movement ==
As early as 1930, the song with the different lyrics can be found in the Songbook for the Königin-Luise-Bund, the women's organization of the Frontsoldatenbund Stahlhelm: "Brandenburg all ways – be our watchword – loyalty to the swastika – and loyalty to black-white-red – hail to you too, my Germany – how long will you sleep? – We stand by you in the fight – throw off the slave yoke – Rise high, you red eagle – and shake your garment – Drive the internal and external enemies from our German land.” Since the 1920s, Büchsenschütz has, according to his own statements, been ethnic-nationalistic, and his own authorship of the changed text would be plausible according to Ch. Jansen (TU-Berlin). The historian Daniel Siemens also estimates that Büchsenschütz was already deeply involved in the “ethnic milieu” in 1923. From 1933 onwards, the song was sung, partly in this Swastika version, sung in the Wehrmacht, SS, SA and HJ and printed in folk song books. Büchsenschütz refers to the song in 1934 in the first edition of the Brandenburger Hefte published by the NSDAP Gauleiter Wilhelm Kube as the "song of the National Socialist uprising" and wrote:

Initially, however apolitical its content might be, it remained a 'Nazi song' and was therefore frowned upon by those who thought differently. […] And what was the 'political path' of the song? From the Bismarck Order it went to the 'Frontbann' and the SA and here it was part of the triumph of the national movement, so that it is now considered a much-sung song of the National Socialist uprising. […] Although this song often led to tough clashes with political opponents, the power of the song remained unbroken. […] At the large events of the NSDAP in Berlin in the 'Sportpalast' and in the Lustgarten the Brandenburger Lied was heard and recruited new fighters for the new Germany.

== Anthem in Brandenburg ==
In the GDR, the song was undesirable during the Nazi era because of its significance, and from 1952 onwards possibly also because the Länder no longer existed after the regional reform with the abolition of the Länder and the creation of Bezirken.

In the Federal Republic, the "Märkische Heide" was, like many old marching songs, part of the Bundeswehr's repertoire. In October 1990, it was sung at the inaugural meeting of the first Brandenburg State Parliament.

The song is also played on official occasions of the Brandenburg State Government, such as at receptions, but also when honoring people.

Attempts by the SPD (1994) and the DVU (2007) to give the song the status of an official state anthem failed in the state parliament.

== Sound recordings ==
During the National Socialist era, there were several record releases with a brass band arrangement by Paul Lincke, performed by bands and choirs of the SA. In several single releases of the Horst-Wessel-Lied, the song was pressed onto the B-side. This version was also later found on post-war compilations (some of which were banned in Germany).

After 1945, the Märkische Heide, like many local songs, was part of Heino's repertoire. Other publications include those by the Schöneberg Boys' Choir or the Bundeswehr Staff Music Corps.

== Controversies ==
In 2008, parts of the Left Party again called for the use of the song to be stopped. The Brandenburg SPD general secretary Klaus Ness then called the demand "far-fetched", the Brandenburg CDU parliamentary group leader Thomas Lunacek pointed out that the text was "politically harmless". Manfred Stolpe (SPD) and Interior Minister Jörg Schönbohm (CDU) warned against denigrating the Märkische Heide as a "Nazi song".

== Literature ==
- Andrea Beyerlein, Jens Blankennagel:. In: Berliner Zeitung, 27 May 2008.

== See also ==
- German anthems
- Kingdom of Prussia topics
