= Klinge =

Klinge Klinka
- Gemeindeteil of Wiesengrund
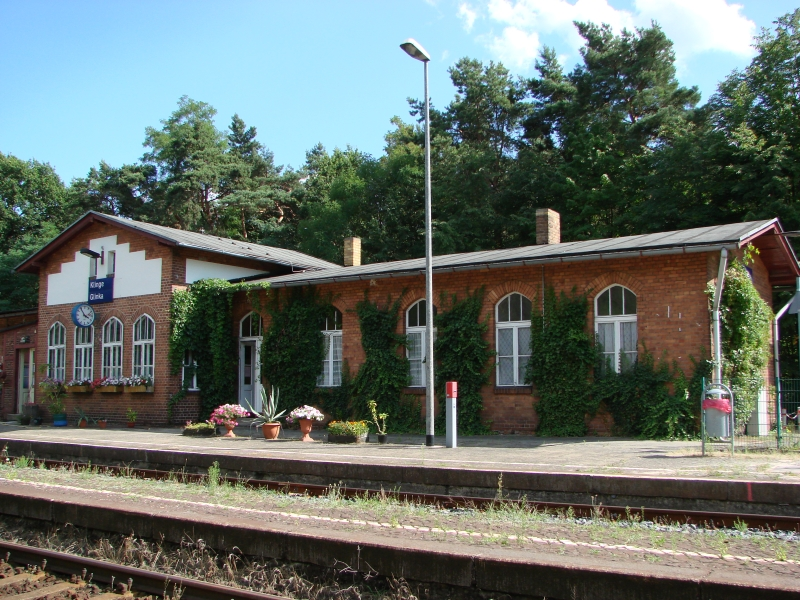
- Railway station
- Interactive map of Klinge
- Location within Germany Location within Brandenburg
- Coordinates: 51°44′36″N 14°31′08″E
- Country: Germany
- State: Brandenburg
- District: Spree-Neiße
- Municipality: Wiesengrund
- Time zone: UTC+01:00 (CET)
  - Summer (DST): UTC+02:00 (CEST)

Klinge (Lower Sorbian: Klinka) is a village in the Lower Lusatia region, east of the city of Cottbus in Brandenburg. It is a part (Gemeindeteil) of the municipality of Wiesengrund.

In 1880, the village had a population of 376, almost exclusively Sorbian by ethnicity.

== Transport ==
The Klinge station is served once an hour in each direction by the RB46 train travelling between Cottbus and Forst.
