= Klinge station =

Railway station in Germany

Klinge Glinka
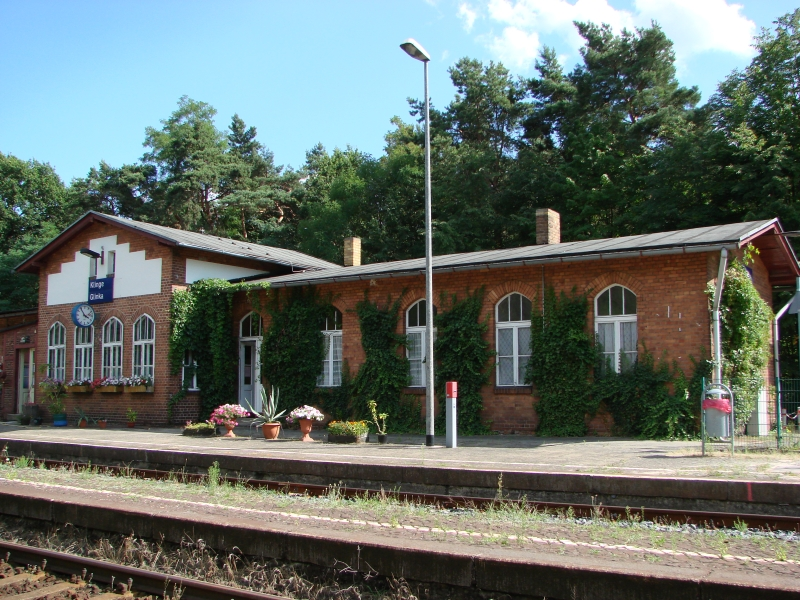
- Station in 2010

General information
- Location: Bahnhofstraße/Alt Sergener Weg; 03149 Wiesengrund/Klinge; Brandenburg; Germany
- Coordinates: 51.7435°N 14.5183°E
- Owner: DB Netz
- Operator: DB Station&Service
- Lines: Cottbus–Żary railway (KBS 209.46)
- Platforms: 2 side platforms
- Tracks: 2
- Train operators: Ostdeutsche Eisenbahn

Other information
- Station code: 3269
- DS100 code: BKG
- IBNR: 8012043
- Category: 6
- Fare zone: VBB: Cottbus C/7373
- Website: www.bahnhof.de

Services
Preceding station	Ostdeutsche Eisenbahn	Following station
Cottbus-Sandow towards Cottbus Hbf	RB 46	Forst (Lausitz) Terminus
Preceding station	DB Regio Nordost	Following station
Cottbus-Sandow towards Cottbus Hbf	RB 93	Forst (Lausitz) towards Żagań
Location
- Location within Brandenburg Location within Germany Location within Europe

Klinge/Glinka (German: Bahnhof Klinge; Lower Sorbian: Dwórnišćo Glinka) is a railway station in the Klinge district in the municipality of Wiesengrund, located in the Spree-Neiße district in Brandenburg, Germany.

== Images ==
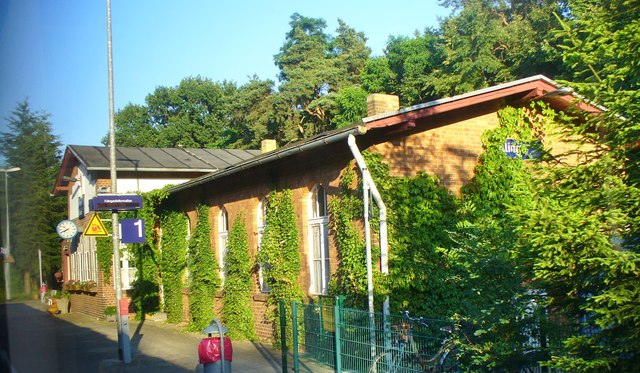
Station and platform decoration, 2013

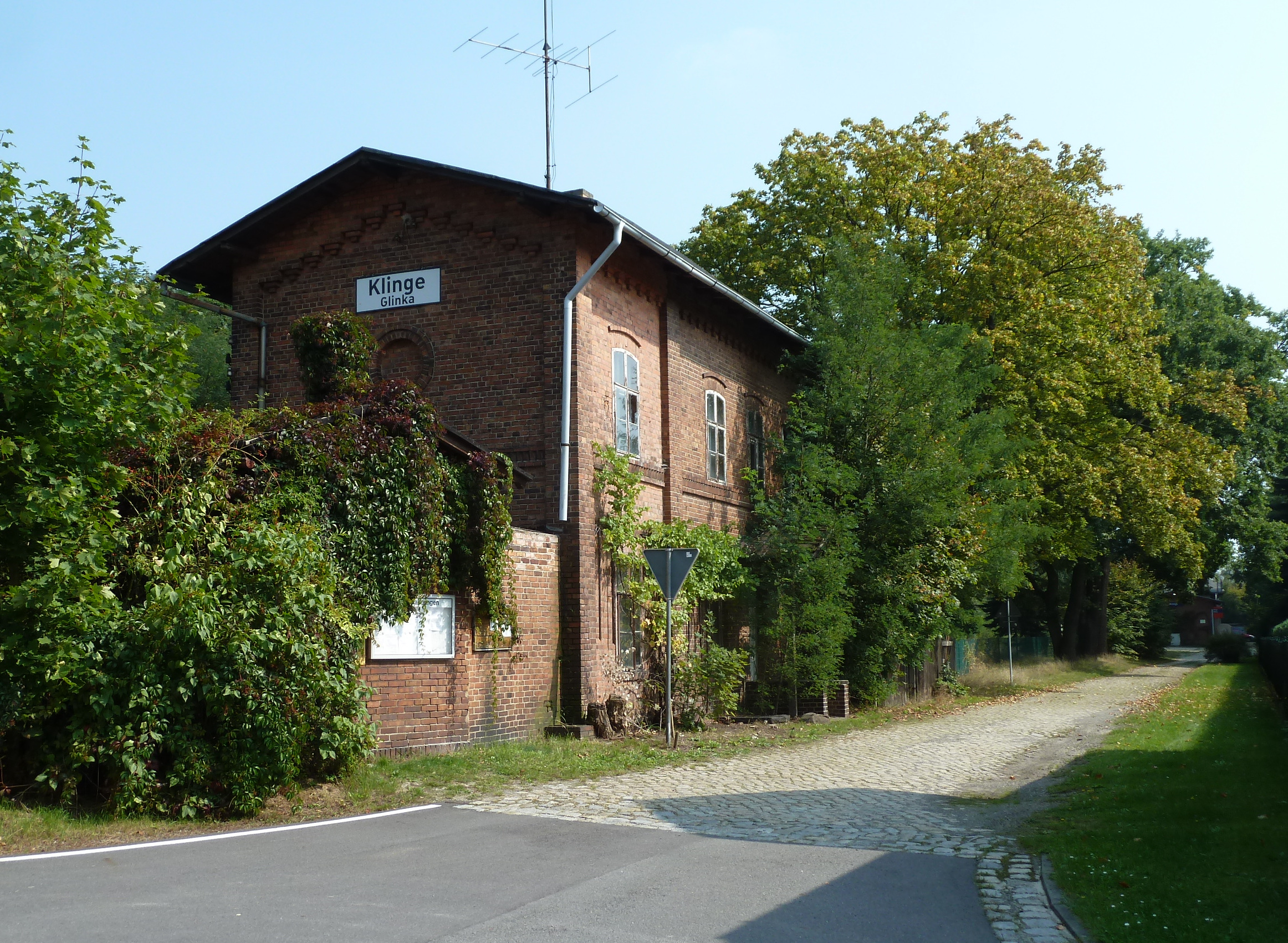
Station building on the street side

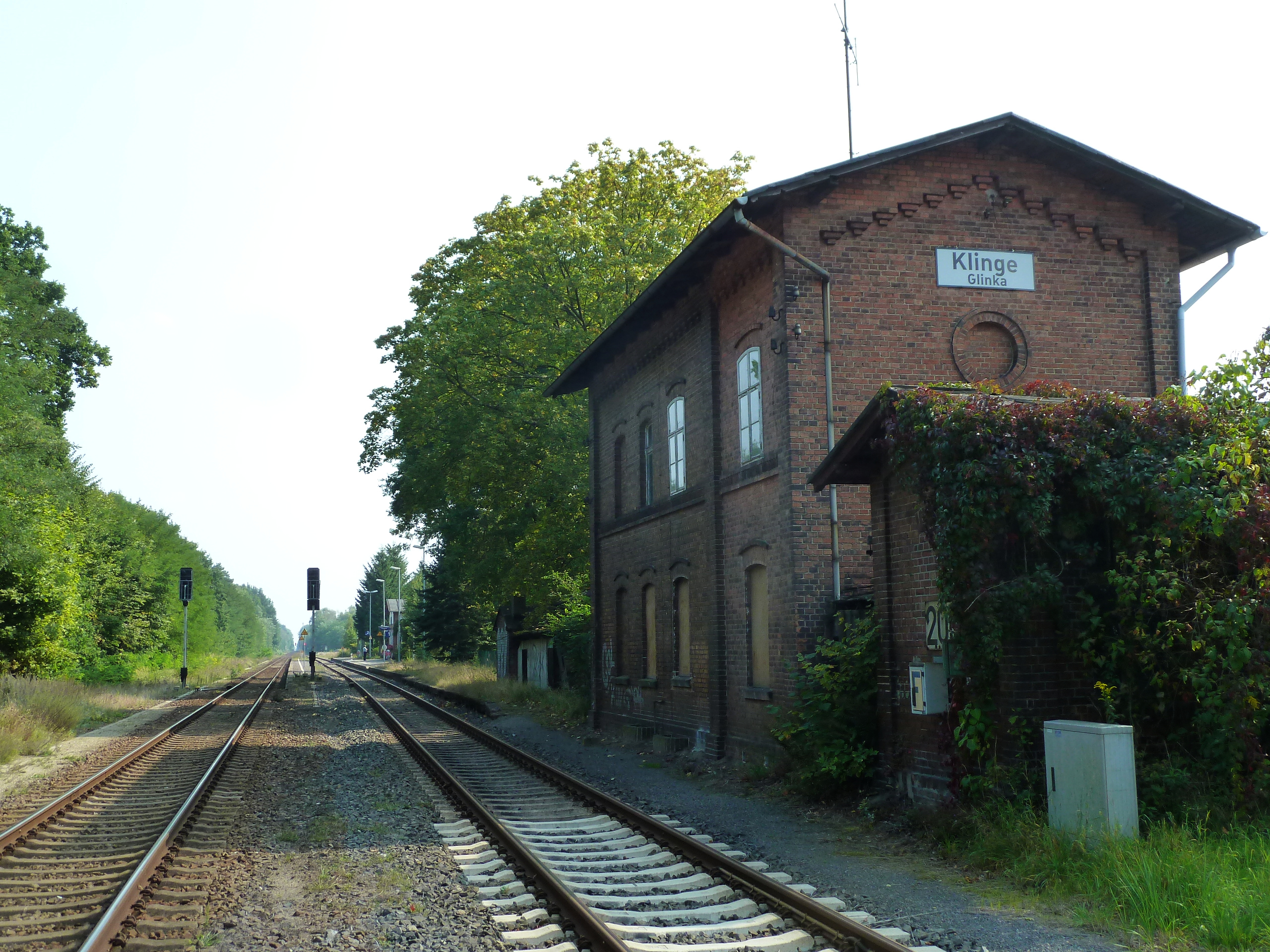
View to the station from the west

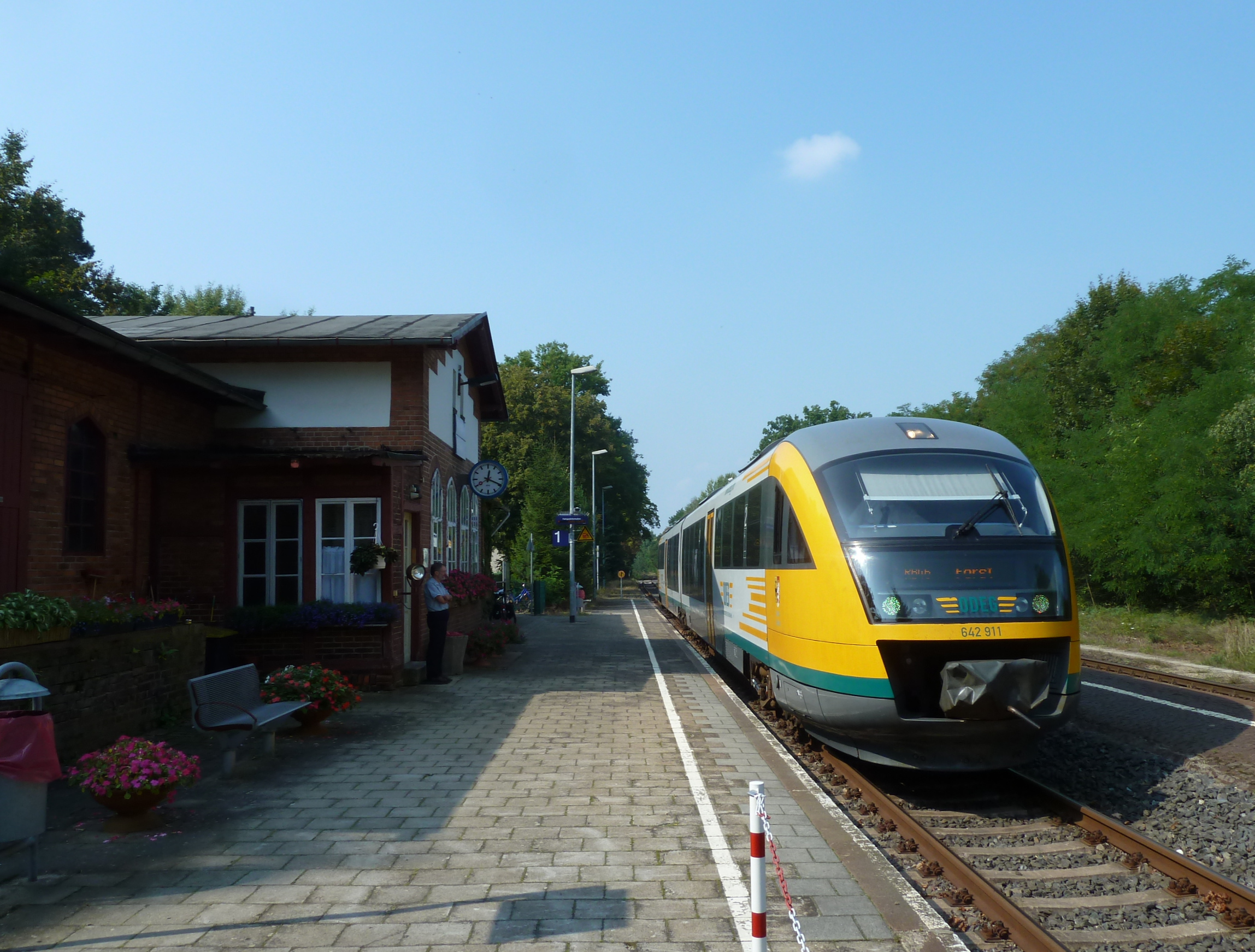
ODEG train at platform, 2014
