= Wiesa (Kamenz) =

Coordinates: 51°15′21″N 14°07′06″E

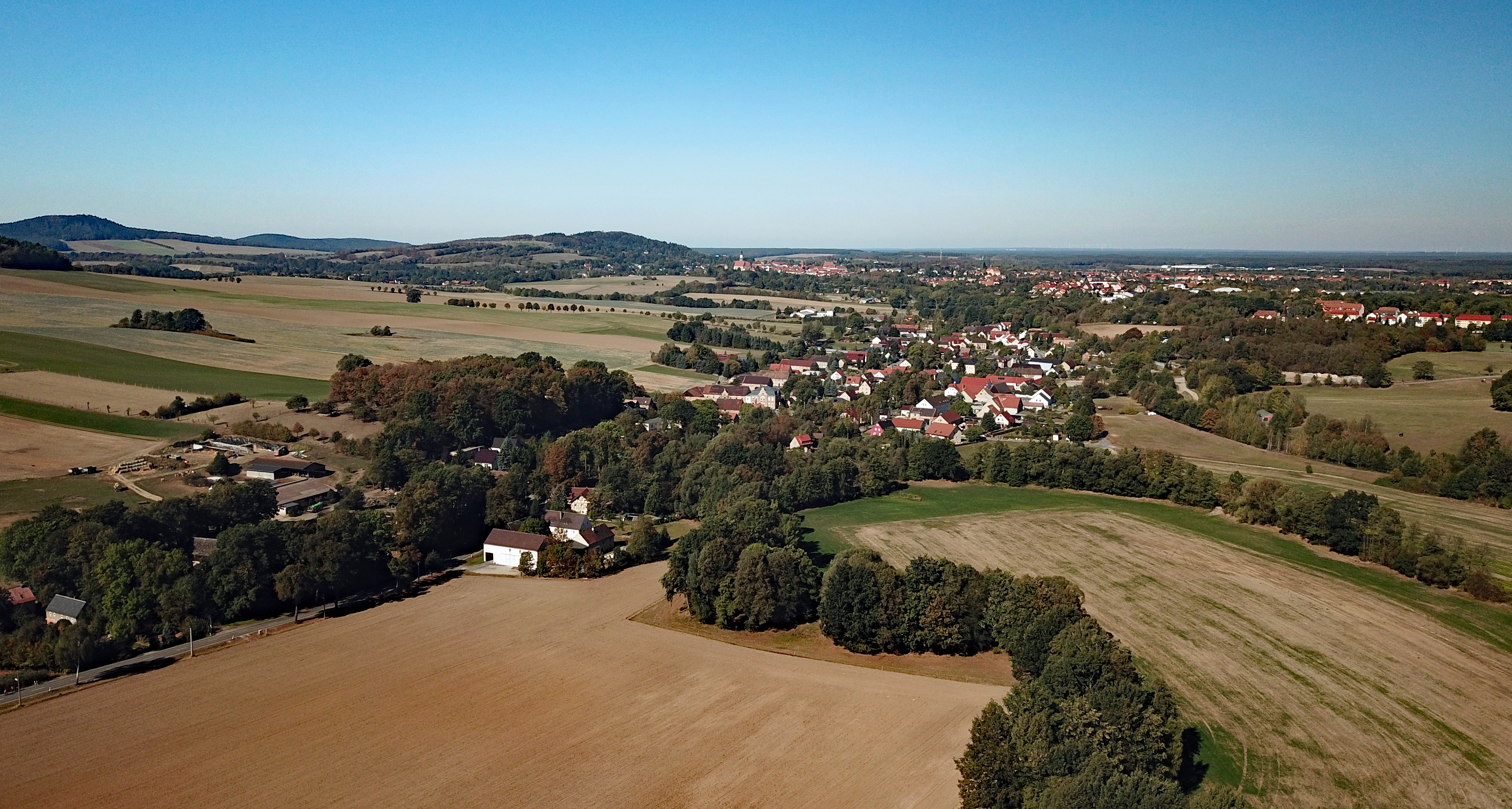

Wiesa (German pronunciation: ['viːza]) or Brěznja (Upper Sorbian pronunciation: [ˈbʁʲɪznʲa]) is a locality in the town of Kamenz, Saxony. It is located in the southern part of town, south of the town centre, on the Black Elster in the district of Bautzen. It is a part of the officially recognized Sorbian settlement area.

== History ==
Wiesa was founded in 1238. The main job was, as in many other rural communities, agriculture. In the 19th century, several quarries were created. In 1974, Wiesa was incorporated into the neighboring town of Kamenz.
