= Neschwitz =

Neschwitz Njeswačidło
- Municipality
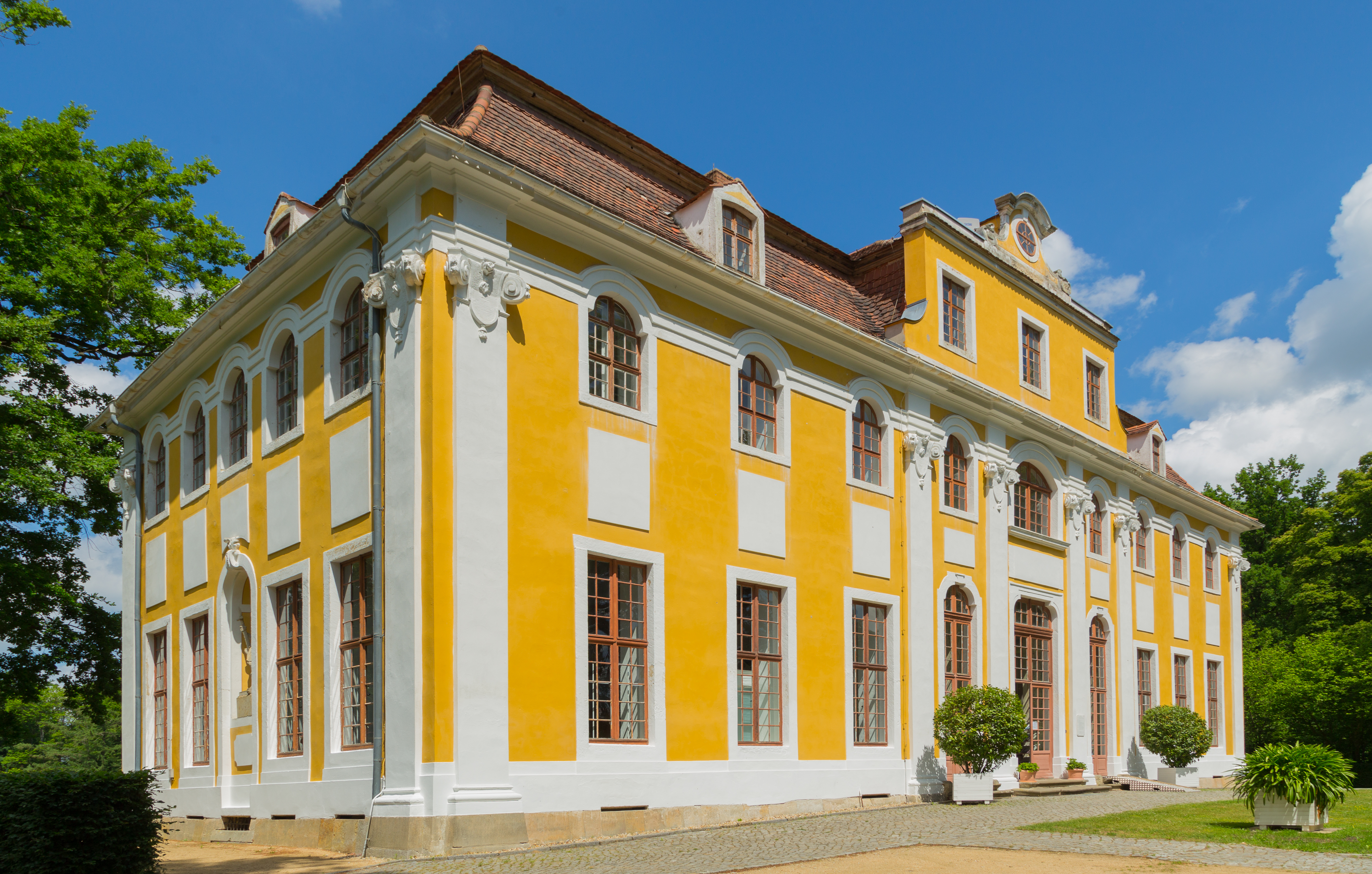
- Castle

- Coat of arms

- Location of Neschwitz within Bautzen district
- Interactive map of Neschwitz
- Location within Germany Location within Saxony
- Coordinates: 51°16′N 14°20′E
- Country: Germany
- State: Saxony
- District: Bautzen
- Subdivisions: 17

Government
  - Mayor (2026–33): Juliane Mazalla

Area
  - Total: 45.99 km^{2} (17.76 sq mi)
- Elevation: 149 m (489 ft)

Population (2025-12-31)
  - Total: 2,323
  - Density: 50.51/km^{2} (130.8/sq mi)
- Time zone: UTC+01:00 (CET)
  - Summer (DST): UTC+02:00 (CEST)
- Postal codes: 02699
- Dialling codes: 035933, 035937
- Vehicle registration: BZ, BIW, HY, KM
- Website: www.neschwitz.de

Neschwitz, Sorbian Njeswačidło, is a municipality in the region of Upper Lusatia in eastern Saxony in eastern Germany. It belongs to the district of Bautzen and lies 14 km northwest of the eponymous city.

The municipality is part of the recognized Sorbian settlement area in Saxony. Upper Sorbian has an official status next to German, all villages bear names in both languages.

== Geography ==
The municipality is situated in the Upper Lusatian flatland.

== Villages ==
Several villages belong to the municipality:

- Neschwitz (Njeswačidło)
- Caßlau (Koslow)
- Doberschütz (Dobrošicy)
- Holscha (Holešow)
- Holschdubrau (Holešowska Dubrawka)
- Kleinholscha ("Holška")
- Krinitz (Króńca)
- Lissahora (Liša Hora)
- Loga (Łahow)
- Lomske (Łomsk)
- Luga (Łuh)
- Neudorf (Nowa Wjes)
- Pannewitz (Banecy)
- Saritsch (Zarěč)
- Übigau (Wbohow)
- Weidlitz (Wutołčicy) and
- Zescha (Šešow)
