= Göda =

Göda Hodźij
- Municipality
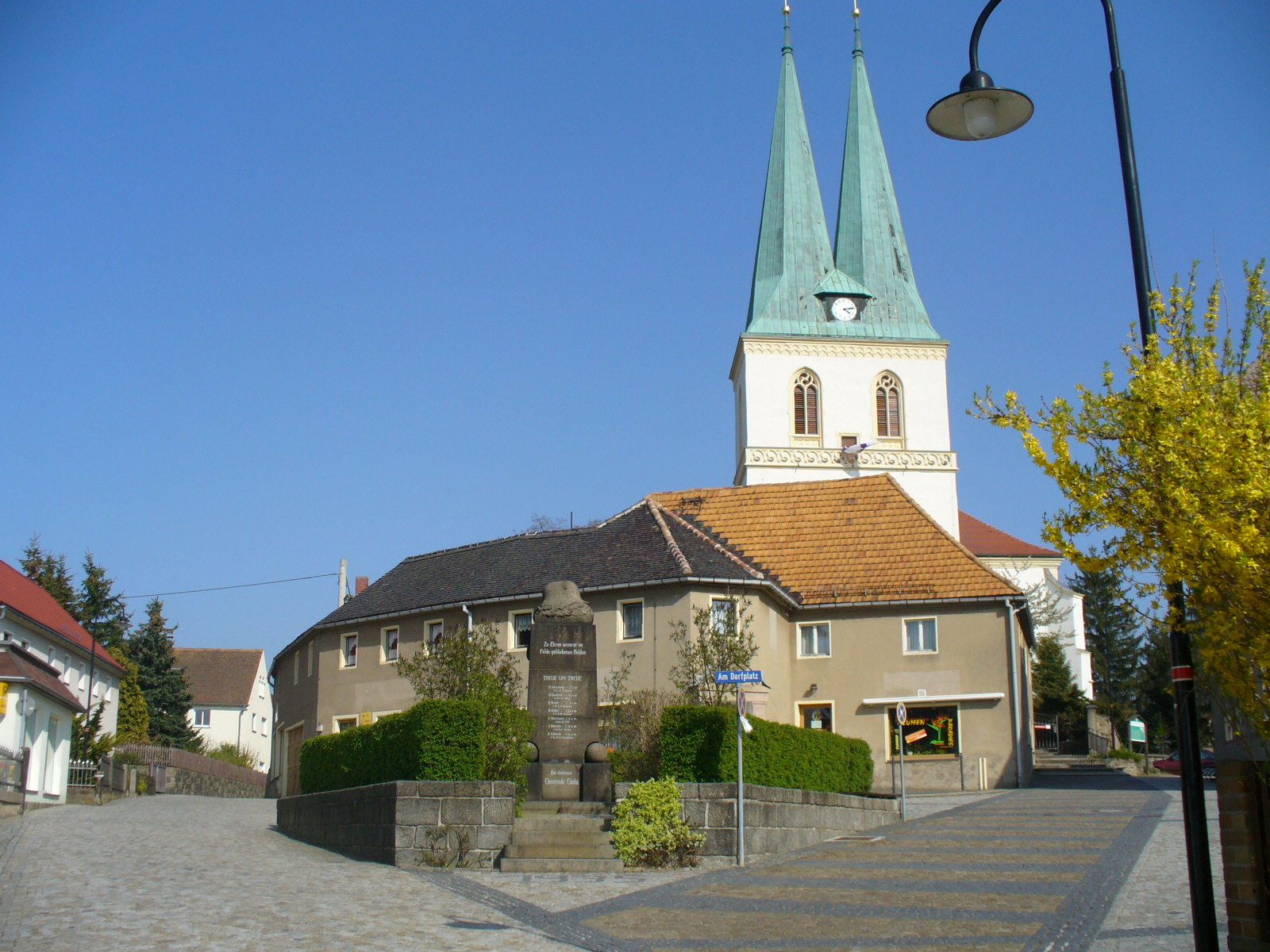

- Coat of arms

- Location of Göda within Bautzen district
- Interactive map of Göda
- Location within Germany Location within Saxony
- Coordinates: 51°11′N 14°19′E
- Country: Germany
- State: Saxony
- District: Bautzen
- Subdivisions: 32

Government
  - Mayor (2022–29): Gerald Meyer

Area
  - Total: 43.27 km^{2} (16.71 sq mi)
- Elevation: 210 m (690 ft)

Population (2025-12-31)
  - Total: 2,907
  - Density: 67.18/km^{2} (174.0/sq mi)
- Time zone: UTC+01:00 (CET)
  - Summer (DST): UTC+02:00 (CEST)
- Postal codes: 02633
- Dialling codes: 035930, 035937
- Vehicle registration: BZ, BIW, HY, KM
- Website: www.goeda.de

Göda (German pronunciation: [ˈɡøːda]; Sorbian languages: Hodźij) is a municipality in the east of Saxony, Germany. It belongs to the district of Bautzen and lies west of the eponymous city.

The municipality is part of the recognized Sorbian settlement area in Saxony. Upper Sorbian has an official status next to German, all settlements bear names in both languages.

== Geography ==
The municipality is located within the hills of Upper Lusatia.

== Villages ==
Several villages belong to the municipality:

- Coblenz (Koblicy) with Coblenz, Dobranitz (Dobranecy), Kleinpraga (Mała Praha), Nedaschütz (Njezdašecy), Pietzschwitz (Běčicy) and Zischkowitz (Čěškecy);
- Göda (Hodźij);
- Göda surroundings with Birkau (Brěza), Buscheritz (Bóšericy), Dahren (Darin), Döbschke (Debiškow), Jannowitz (Janecy) and Semmichau (Zemichow);
- Kleinförstchen (Mała Boršć) with Dreistern (Tři Hwězdy), Kleinförstchen, Neu-Bloaschütz (Nowe Błohašecy), Oberförstchen (Hornja Boršć), Preske (Praskow) and Siebitz (Dźiwoćicy);
- Prischwitz (Prěčecy) with Dreikretscham (Haslow), Liebon (Liboń), Muschelwitz (Myšecy), Paßditz (Pozdecy), Prischwitz, Sollschwitz (Sulšecy), Storcha (Baćoń) and Zscharnitz (Čornecy);
- Seitschen (Žičeń) with Kleinseitschen (Žičeńk) and Seitschen;
- Spittwitz (Spytecy) with Leutwitz (Lutyjecy), Neuspittwitz (Nowe Spytecy) and Spittwitz.
