= Großpostwitz =

Großpostwitz/Budestecy
- Municipality
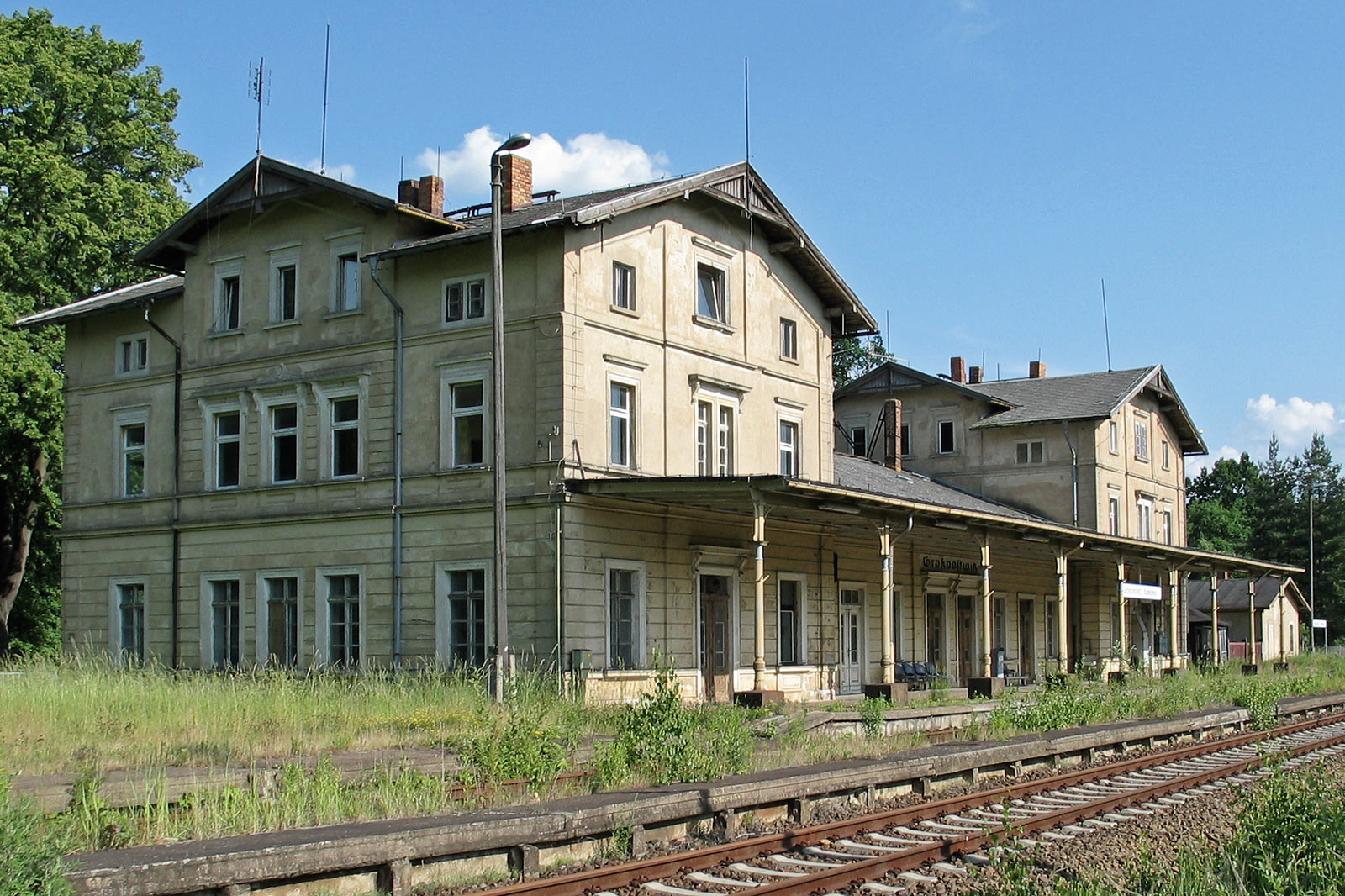
- Former train station

- Coat of arms

- Location of Großpostwitz/Budestecy within Bautzen district
- Interactive map of Großpostwitz/Budestecy
- Location within Germany Location within Saxony
- Coordinates: 51°7′N 14°27′E
- Country: Germany
- State: Saxony
- District: Bautzen
- Subdivisions: 10

Government
  - Mayor (2019–26): Markus Michauk

Area
  - Total: 16.42 km^{2} (6.34 sq mi)
- Elevation: 241 m (791 ft)

Population (2025-12-31)
  - Total: 2,694
  - Density: 164.1/km^{2} (424.9/sq mi)
- Time zone: UTC+01:00 (CET)
  - Summer (DST): UTC+02:00 (CEST)
- Postal codes: 02692
- Dialling codes: 035938
- Vehicle registration: BZ, BIW, HY, KM
- Website: www.grosspostwitz.de

Großpostwitz (German) or Budestecy (Upper Sorbian) is a municipality in the east of Saxony, Germany. It belongs to Bautzen district and lies south of the town of Bautzen.

The municipality except Eulowitz is part of the recognized Sorbian settlement area in Saxony. Upper Sorbian has an official status next to German, all villages bear names in both languages.

== Geography ==
The municipality is situated at the northern edge of the Lausitzer Bergland (Lusatian Hills) along the Spree. The Bundesstraße 96 passes Großpostwitz.

== Villages ==
Several villages belong to the municipality:

- Berge/Zahor
- Binnewitz/Bónjecy
- Cosul/Kózły
- Ebendörfel/Bělšecy
- Eulowitz/Jiłocy
- Großpostwitz/Budestecy
- Klein Kunitz/Chójnička
- Mehltheuer/Lubjenc
- Rascha/Rašow
- Denkwitz/Dźenikecy

== History ==
Within the German Empire (1871-1918), Großpostwitz was part of the Kingdom of Saxony.
