= Gustav Büchsenschütz =

German poet (1902-1996)

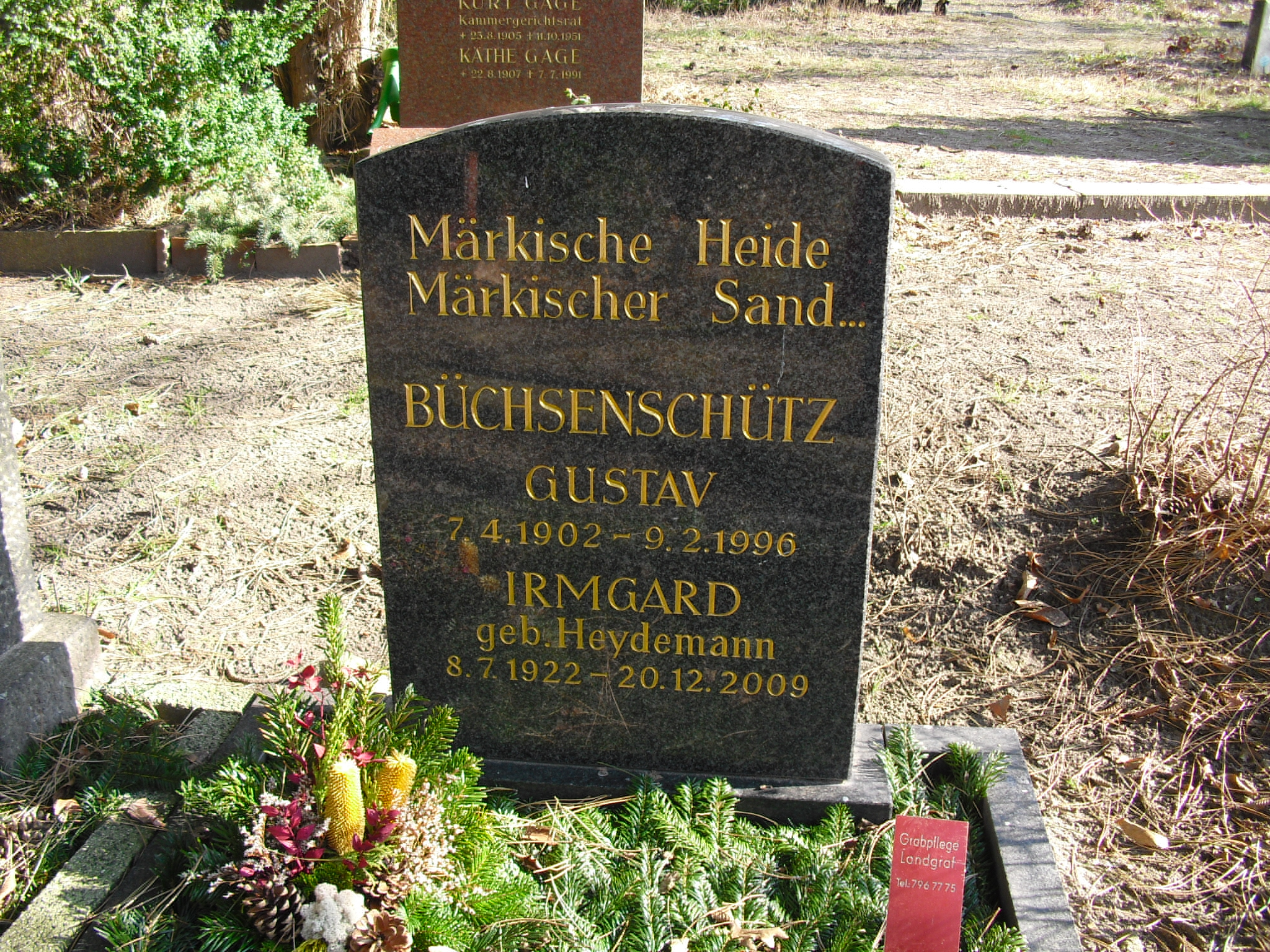
Gravestone in the Steglitz Cemetery

Gustav Büchsenschütz (born 7 April 1902 in Berlin, died 9 February 1996 in Berlin) is the poet of the song "Brandenburglied" (Märkische Heide, märkischer Sand).

Büchsenschütz was the son of a gendarme. After obtaining his primary school certificate, he entered the administrative service of the municipality of Groß Lichterfelde. He went through a senior civil service career, which he ended after five decades as head of the sports and swimming pool department of the Berlin Steglitz district.

He belonged to the Wandervogel movement. On the occasion of an excursion in 1923, he wrote the text and melody of the song "Märkische Heide, märkischer Sand" in the youth hostel Wolfslake near Neu-Vehlefanz, which soon became very popular.

With an arrangement by Paul Lincke, the song was adopted as a march song during the National Socialist era. With the re-establishment of the state of Brandenburg in 1990, Prime Minister Manfred Stolpe promoted the renewed popularization of the song, so that it has now become the unofficial anthem of the state.

In 1975, Büchsenschütz was awarded the Cross of Merit on Ribbon of the Federal Republic of Germany.
