= Cottbus-Sandow station =

Railway station in Brandenburg, Germany

Cottbus Sandow Chóśebuz Zandow
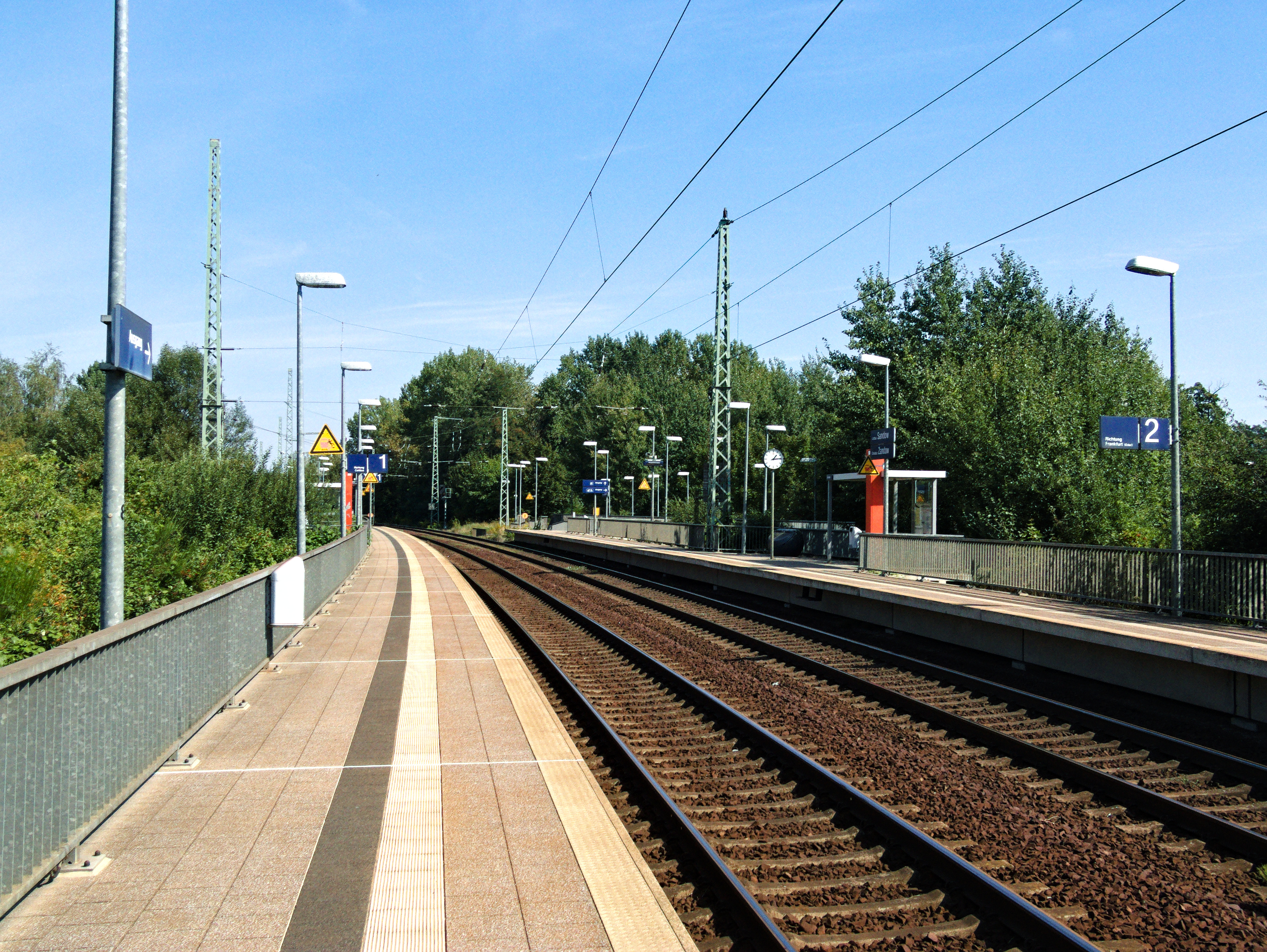
- 2016

General information
- Location: Am Eliaspark 2; 03042 Cottbus; Brandenburg; Germany
- Coordinates: 51.7551°N 14.3535°E
- Owner: DB Netz
- Operator: DB Station&Service
- Lines: Cottbus–Guben railway (KBS 211); Cottbus–Żary railway (KBS 209.46)
- Platforms: 3 side platforms
- Tracks: 3
- Train operators: DB Regio Nordost; Ostdeutsche Eisenbahn

Other information
- Station code: 5503
- DS100 code: BCSO
- IBNR: 8011318
- Category: 6
- Fare zone: VBB: Cottbus A/7270
- Website: www.bahnhof.de

Services
Preceding station	DB Regio Nordost	Following station
Cottbus Hbf towards Leipzig Hbf	RE 10	Cottbus-Merzdorf towards Frankfurt (Oder)
Cottbus Hbf towards Herzberg (Elster)	RB 43	Cottbus-Merzdorf towards Frankfurt (Oder)
Cottbus Hbf Terminus	RB 92	Guben towards Zielona Gora
Cottbus Hbf Terminus	RB 93	Klinge towards Żagań
Preceding station	Ostdeutsche Eisenbahn	Following station
Cottbus Hbf Terminus	RB 46	Klinge towards Forst (Lausitz)
Location

Cottbus-Sandow station is a railway station in the Sandow district in the town of Cottbus, located in Brandenburg, Germany.
