= Kaspar Ludwig von Bredow =

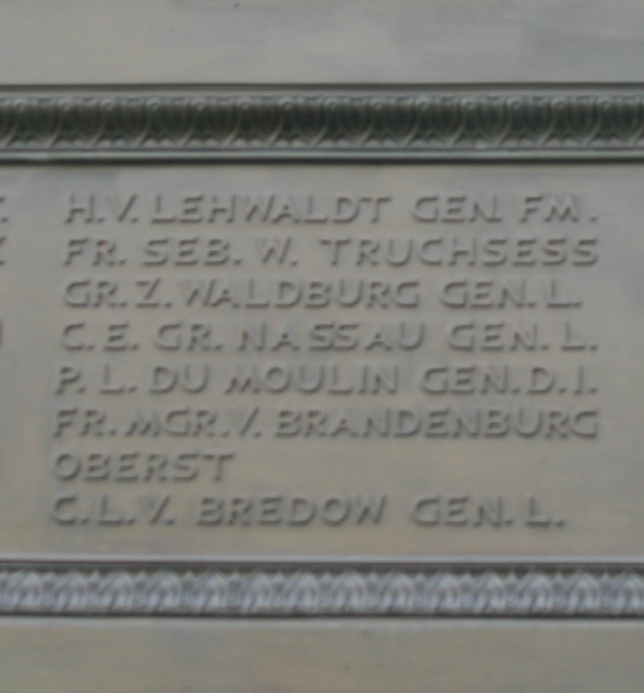
- Bredow is listed on the Equestrian statue of Frederick the Great
- Born: 1685; Neu Zauche, Brandenburg
- Died: 11 June 1773 (aged 87–88); Schloss Ihlow
- Relatives: Frederick Siegmund von Bredow
- Military career
- Allegiance: (Kingdom of Prussia) Prussia
- Branch: Army
- Service years: 1700–1751
- Rank: General
- Conflicts: War of the Spanish Succession; First Silesian War; Second Silesian War
- Awards: Pour le Mérite; Black Eagle Order; Equestrian statue of Frederick the Great 1851

Kaspar Ludwig von Bredow (born 1685 in Neu Zauche, Mittelmark, died 11 June 1773 at Schloss Ihlow) was a Prussian lieutenant general, Knight of the Black Eagle Order, recipient of the Order Pour le Mérite and heir to Ihlow. He is regarded as one of the Crown Prince Frederick's military mentors.

== Family ==
Kaspar Ludwig von Bredow was born in 1685 in Neu Zauche, Mittelmark, Brandenburg. His parents were Siegmund Gottfried von Bredow and Barbara Christina von Pannewitz (born c. 1653). His older brother, Frederick Siegmund von Bredow (1683–1759), was also one of Frederick's generals. He married Dorothea Antoinette von Dachröden; the couple had two sons and a daughter. Both sons joined the military.

== Military career ==
Bredow began his career in the Prussian 21st Regiment of Foot Dönhoff and fought with the old general Ernst Wladislaus von Dönhoff in the War of Spanish Succession. In 1715 he was a captain of the Siege of Stralsund. On the 4 July 1720, he was promoted to major, and, subsequently on 14 July 1730, to lieutenant-colonel. When the Crown Prince Friedrich was sent as part of the relief force to the Siege of Philippsburg during the Rhine campaign in 1734, Lieutenant-Colonel von Bredow was one of his "military mentors".

After the debacle of the Katt affair in 1730, the Crown Prince lived in virtual house arrest in Rheinsberg; by 1733, after visiting his recalcitrant son, Frederick William eased the restrictions on the prince's life, and sent him on the Imperial military campaign in the Rhineland. Bredow was assigned by Frederick William I to teach the Crown Prince "order and economy" (Ordung und Haushaltung). He was not only an "observer", assigned to watch over the prince and report back to the king any problems, and presumably to report back to the king, Bredow developed a good mentoring relationship with Frederick. He stayed with the Crown Prince from early 1734 through December, when Frederick returned to Berlin. Bredow traveled between the front, Berlin, and Bayreuth several times. In February of that year, Frederick wrote to his sister: "Captain Bredow has scared us all so much, especially me, when he said he found you so altered he did not recognize you and that you would not eat anything."

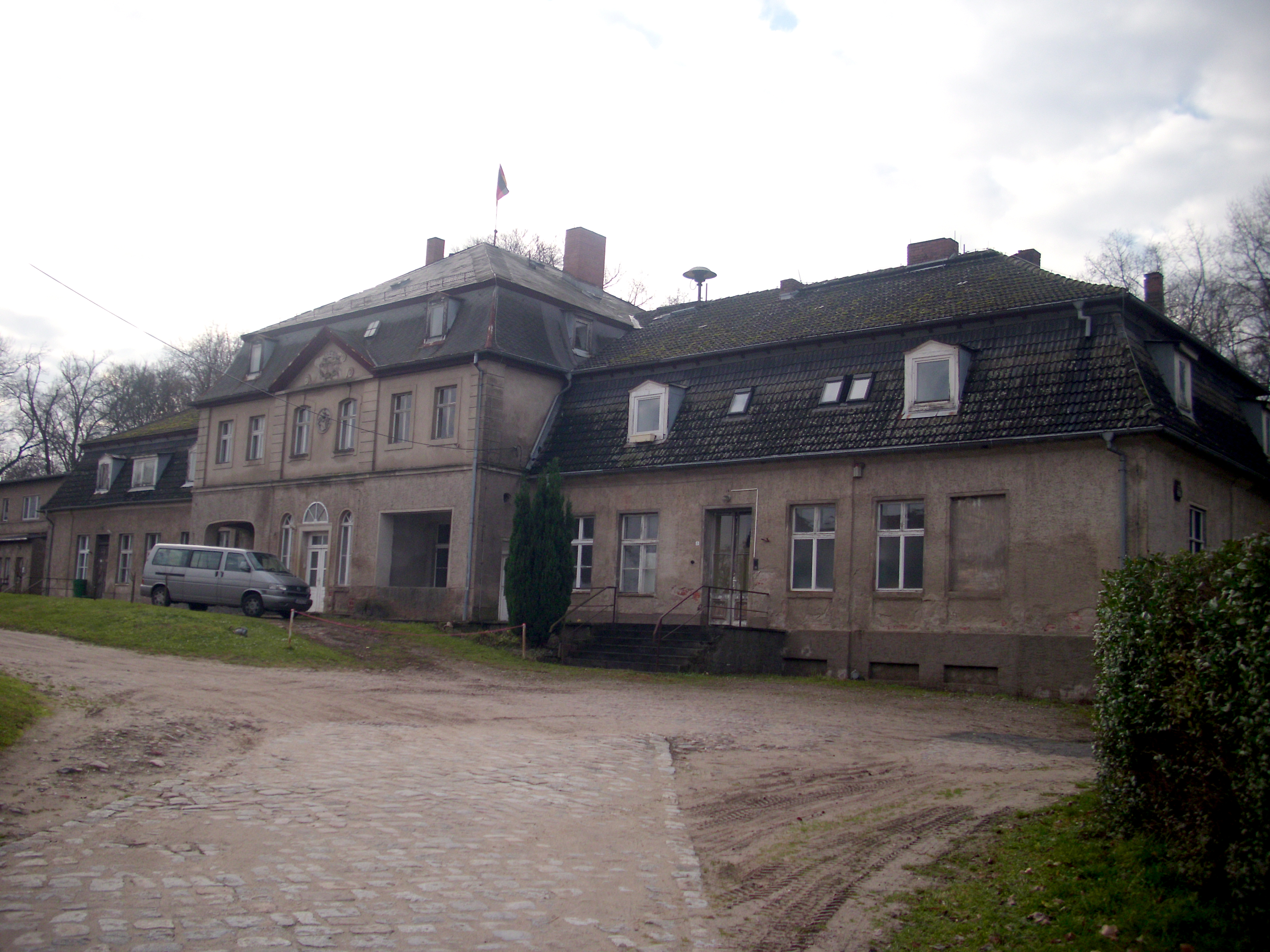
The Bredow family estate.

Bredow remained within Frederick's reach upon his ascension to the throne in 1740. During the War of Austrian Succession, in the First Silesian War, Bredow served in several campaigns throughout Silesia and Bohemia. After the Battle of Chotusitz in 1743, Frederick awarded him the Pour le Mérite and in 1748, the Order of the Black Eagle. Bredow retired from the army in 1751, with a pension, and lived the rest of his days in the family estate at Schloss Ihlow.
