= Märkische Heide =

Municipality in Brandenburg, Germany

Märkische Heide Markojska Góla
- Municipality
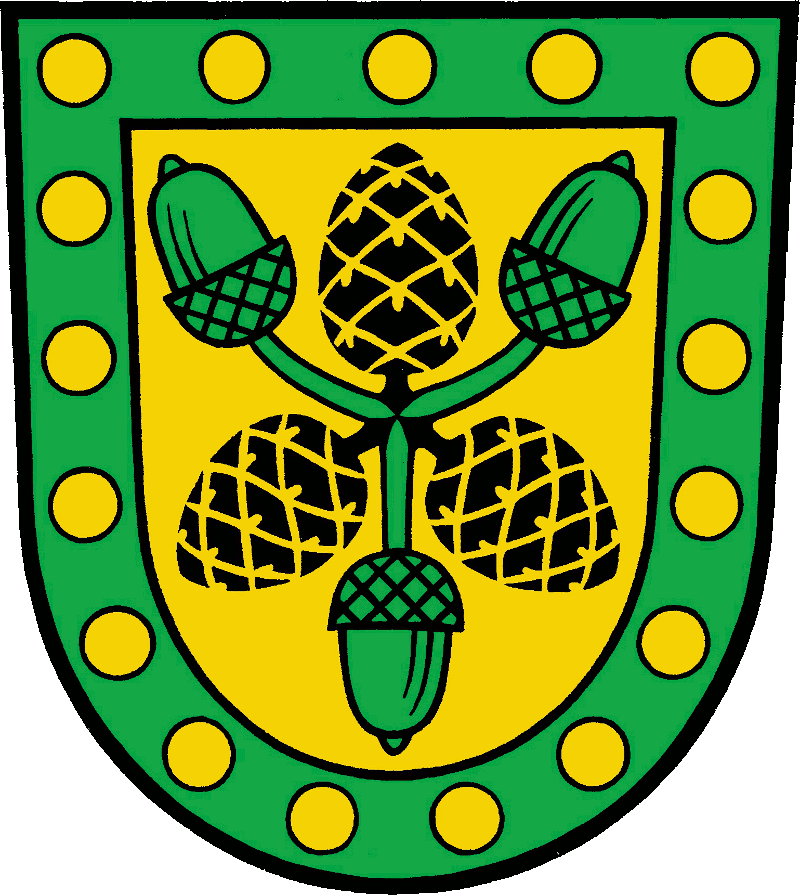
- Coat of arms

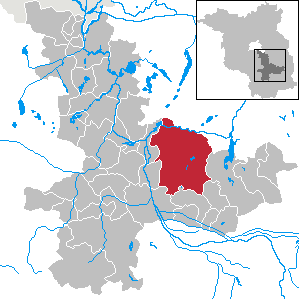
- Location of Märkische Heide within Dahme-Spreewald district
- Interactive map of Märkische Heide
- Location within Germany Location within Brandenburg
- Coordinates: 52°02′20″N 14°02′17″E
- Country: Germany
- State: Brandenburg
- District: Dahme-Spreewald
- Subdivisions: 17 Ortsteile

Government
  - Mayor (2022–30): Dieter Freihoff (SPD)

Area
  - Total: 210.10 km^{2} (81.12 sq mi)
- Elevation: 50 m (160 ft)

Population (2025-12-31)
  - Total: 3,736
  - Density: 17.78/km^{2} (46.06/sq mi)
- Time zone: UTC+01:00 (CET)
  - Summer (DST): UTC+02:00 (CEST)
- Postal codes: 15913
- Dialling codes: 035471
- Vehicle registration: LDS
- Website: www.maerkische-heide.de

Märkische Heide (German) or Markojska Góla (Lower Sorbian) is a municipality in the district of Dahme-Spreewald in Brandenburg in Germany.

On 26 October 2003, the municipality of Märkische Heide was formed by merging 17 municipalities: Alt-Schadow, Biebersdorf, Dollgen, Dürrenhofe, Glietz, Gröditsch, Groß Leine, Groß Leuthen, Hohenbrück-Neu Schadow, Klein Leine, Krugau, Kuschkow, Leibchel, Plattkow, Pretschen, Schuhle-Wiese and Wittmannsdorf-Bückchen.

Parts of the municipality are in the Sorbian settlement area; in those areas, the German and Lower Sorbian languages have equal status. Markojska Góla is the northernmost part of the surviving settlement regions.

"Märkische Heide", also known as "Brandenburglied", is the title of a well-known German song, whose text mainly praises the beauty of the local countryside. The Chilean military song Mi fusil y yo adopted its melody.

== History ==
The constituent localities of Märkische Heide were part of the Prussian Province of Brandenburg from 1815 to 1947, and from 1947 to 1952 they were part of the Soviet and GDR State of Brandenburg. From 1952 to 1990 in East Germany, Plattkow was in the Bezirk Frankfurt and the rest were in the Bezirk Cottbus (Alt-Schadow, Biebersdorf, Dollgen, Dürrenhofe, Glietz, Gröditsch, Groß Leine, Groß Leuthen, Hohenbrück-Neu Schadow, Klein Leine, Krugau, Kuschkow, Leibchel, Pretschen, Schuhle-Wiese and Wittmannsdorf-Bückchen). Since 1990, the area has been part of the revived state of Brandenburg, since 2003 united as the municipality of Märkische Heide.

== Demography ==
Development of Population since 1875 within the Current Boundaries (Blue Line: Population; Dotted Line: Comparison to Population Development of Brandenburg state; Grey Background: Time of Nazi rule; Red Background: Time of Communist rule)

Recent Population Development and Projections (Population Development before Census 2011 (blue line); Recent Population Development according to the Census in Germany in 2011 (blue bordered line); Official projections for 2005-2030 (yellow line); for 2020-2030 (green line); for 2017-2030 (scarlet line)

Märkische Heide: Population development
within the current boundaries (2017)

Year	Pop.	±% p.a.
1875	6,257	—
1890	6,070	−0.20%
1910	5,747	−0.27%
1925	5,511	−0.28%
1933	5,279	−0.54%
1939	5,064	−0.69%
1946	8,101	+6.94%
1950	7,730	−1.17%
1964	6,031	−1.76%
1971	5,870	−0.39%
1981	5,347	−0.93%
1985	5,193	−0.73%
1989	5,184	−0.04%
1990	5,134	−0.96%
1991	5,062	−1.40%

Year	Pop.	±% p.a.
1992	5,148	+1.70%
1993	5,145	−0.06%
1994	4,984	−3.13%
1995	4,989	+0.10%
1996	4,977	−0.24%
1997	4,981	+0.08%
1998	5,000	+0.38%
1999	4,975	−0.50%
2000	4,980	+0.10%
2001	4,946	−0.68%
2002	4,899	−0.95%
2003	4,841	−1.18%
2004	4,772	−1.43%
2005	4,760	−0.25%
2006	4,684	−1.60%

Year	Pop.	±% p.a.
2007	4,585	−2.11%
2008	4,464	−2.64%
2009	4,396	−1.52%
2010	4,313	−1.89%
2011	4,137	−4.08%
2012	4,067	−1.69%
2013	4,002	−1.60%
2014	3,989	−0.32%
2015	3,954	−0.88%
2016	3,915	−0.99%
2017	3,880	−0.89%
2018	3,893	+0.34%
2019	3,894	+0.03%
2020	3,904	+0.26%
