= Jamlitz =

- Municipality
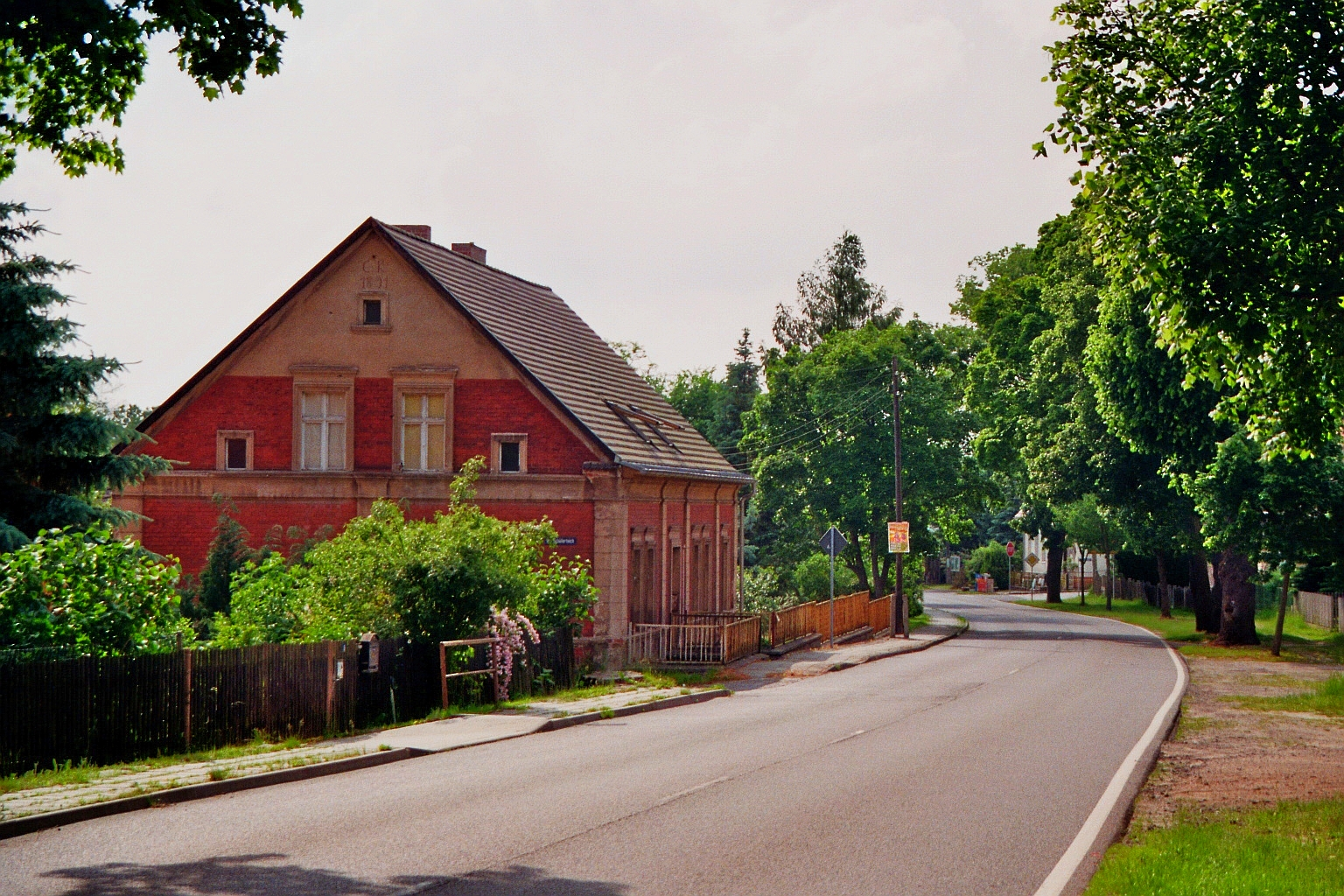
- Main road in Jamlitz

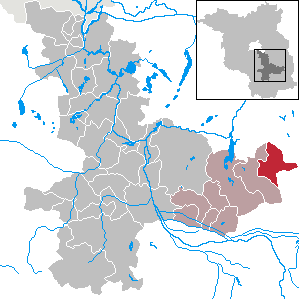
- Location of Jamlitz within Dahme-Spreewald district
- Interactive map of Jamlitz
- Location within Germany Location within Brandenburg
- Coordinates: 52°00′00″N 14°22′00″E
- Country: Germany
- State: Brandenburg
- District: Dahme-Spreewald
- Municipal assoc.: Lieberose/Oberspreewald
- Subdivisions: 2 Ortsteile

Government
  - Mayor (2019–24): Wilfried Götze

Area
  - Total: 42.76 km^{2} (16.51 sq mi)
- Elevation: 54 m (177 ft)

Population (2025-12-31)
  - Total: 501
  - Density: 11.7/km^{2} (30.3/sq mi)
- Time zone: UTC+01:00 (CET)
  - Summer (DST): UTC+02:00 (CEST)
- Postal codes: 15868
- Dialling codes: 033671
- Vehicle registration: LDS
- Website: Gemeinde Jamlitz

Jamlitz (Lower Sorbian: Jemjelnica) is a municipality in the district of Dahme-Spreewald in Brandenburg in Germany.

== History ==
From 1815 to 1947, Jamlitz was part of the Prussian Province of Brandenburg.

After World War II, Jamlitz was incorporated into the State of Brandenburg from 1947 to 1952 and the Bezirk Frankfurt of East Germany from 1952 to 1990. Since 1990, Jamlitz is again part of Brandenburg.

== Demography ==
Development of population since 1875 within the current boundaries (Blue line: Population; Dotted line: Comparison to population development of Brandenburg state; Grey background: Time of Nazi rule; Red background: Time of communist rule)

Jamlitz: Population development
within the current boundaries (2020)

Year	Pop.	±% p.a.
1875	1,087	—
1890	967	−0.78%
1910	900	−0.36%
1925	987	+0.62%
1933	844	−1.94%
1939	787	−1.16%
1946	1,566	+10.33%
1950	1,451	−1.89%
1964	1,105	−1.93%
1971	1,069	−0.47%
1981	852	−2.24%
1985	816	−1.07%
1989	748	−2.15%
1990	738	−1.34%
1991	724	−1.90%

Year	Pop.	±% p.a.
1992	719	−0.69%
1993	719	+0.00%
1994	705	−1.95%
1995	701	−0.57%
1996	691	−1.43%
1997	684	−1.01%
1998	668	−2.34%
1999	669	+0.15%
2000	672	+0.45%
2001	658	−2.08%
2002	663	+0.76%
2003	645	−2.71%
2004	631	−2.17%
2005	617	−2.22%
2006	611	−0.97%

Year	Pop.	±% p.a.
2007	615	+0.65%
2008	600	−2.44%
2009	602	+0.33%
2010	598	−0.66%
2011	583	−2.51%
2012	570	−2.23%
2013	553	−2.98%
2014	550	−0.54%
2015	534	−2.91%
2016	531	−0.56%
2017	523	−1.51%
2018	526	+0.57%
2019	519	−1.33%
2020	512	−1.35%
