= Puschwitz =

Puschwitz/Bóšicy
- Municipality
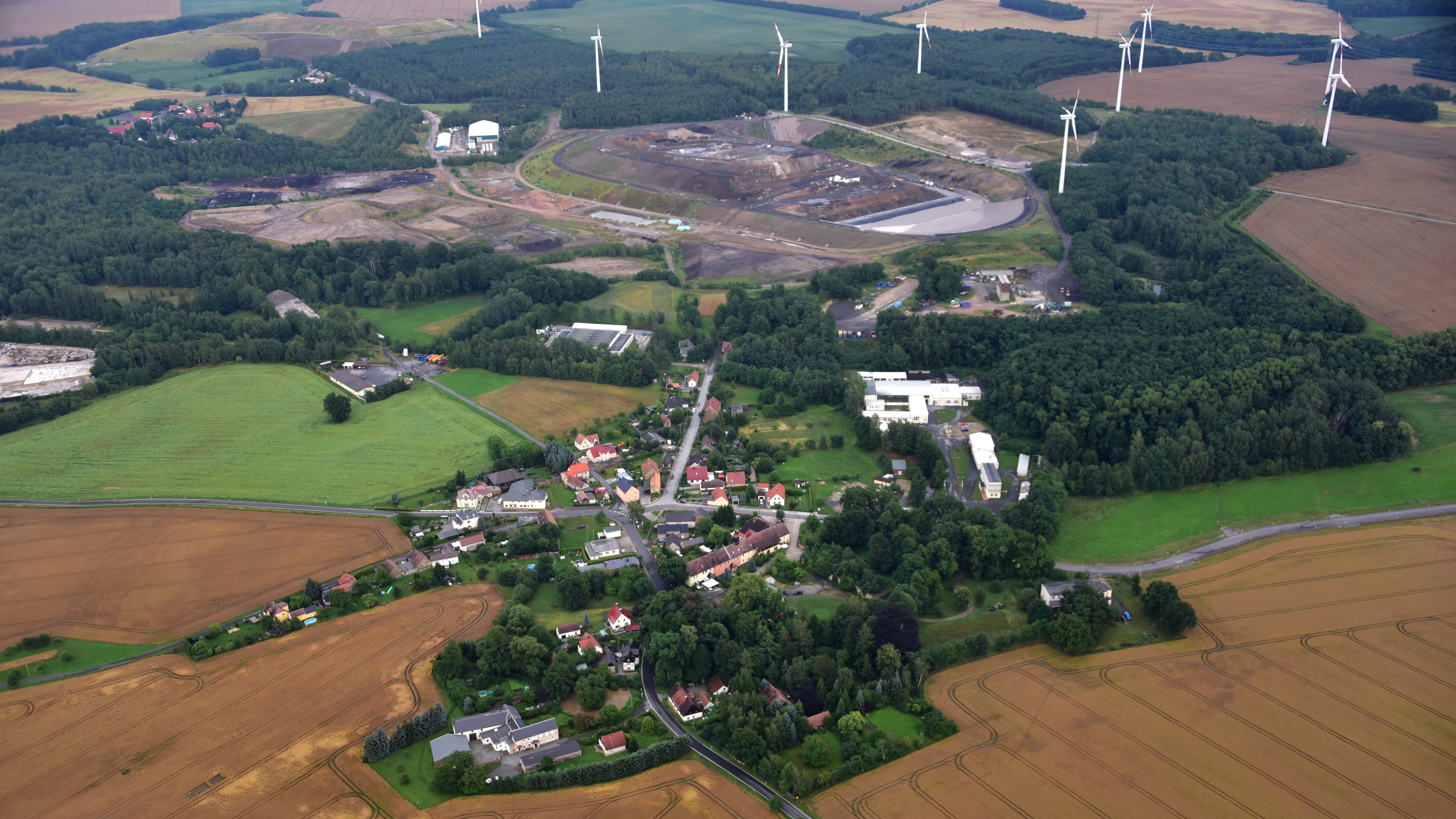
- Airborne View of the Village

- Location of Puschwitz/Bóšicy within Bautzen district
- Interactive map of Puschwitz/Bóšicy
- Location within Germany Location within Saxony
- Coordinates: 51°15′N 14°18′E
- Country: Germany
- State: Saxony
- District: Bautzen
- Subdivisions: 7

Government
  - Mayor (2022–29): Stanislaus Ritscher

Area
  - Total: 11.74 km^{2} (4.53 sq mi)
- Elevation: 180 m (590 ft)

Population (2025-12-31)
  - Total: 776
  - Density: 66.1/km^{2} (171/sq mi)
- Time zone: UTC+01:00 (CET)
  - Summer (DST): UTC+02:00 (CEST)
- Postal codes: 02699
- Dialling codes: 035933
- Vehicle registration: BZ, BIW, HY, KM

Puschwitz (German) or Bóšicy (Upper Sorbian, pronounced [ˈbʊʃitsɨ]) is a municipality in the district of Bautzen, in Saxony, Germany.

It belongs to Upper Lusatia and the settlement area of the Sorbs. The municipality consists of following villages (names given in German/Upper Sorbian):

- Guhra/Hora
- Jeßnitz/Jaseńca
- Lauske/Łusč
- Neu-Jeßnitz/Nowa Jaseńca
- Neu-Lauske/Nowy Łusč
- Neu-Puschwitz/Nowe Bóšicy
- Puschwitz/Bóšicy
- Wetro/Wětrow
