= Lieberose/Oberspreewald =

- Amt
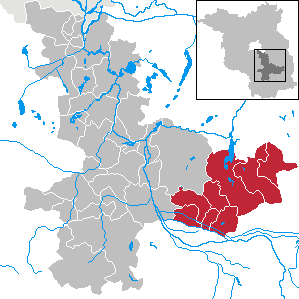
- Map of Dahme-Spreewald highlighting Lieberose/Oberspreewald
- Interactive map of Lieberose/Oberspreewald
- Location within Germany Location within Brandenburg
- Coordinates: 51°55′N 14°07′E
- Country: Germany
- State: Brandenburg
- District: Dahme-Spreewald
- Seat: Lieberose
- Subdivisions: 8 municipalities

Area
  - Total: 413.88 km^{2} (159.80 sq mi)

Population (2025-12-31)
  - Total: 6,860
  - Density: 16.6/km^{2} (42.9/sq mi)
- Time zone: UTC+01:00 (CET)
  - Summer (DST): UTC+02:00 (CEST)
- Website: www.lieberose-oberspreewald.de

Amt Lieberose/Oberspreewald is an Amt ("collective municipality") in the district of Dahme-Spreewald, in Brandenburg, Germany. Its seat is in the town Lieberose.

The Amt Lieberose/Oberspreewald consists of the following municipalities:

1. Alt Zauche-Wußwerk
2. Byhleguhre-Byhlen
3. Jamlitz
4. Lieberose
5. Neu Zauche
6. Schwielochsee
7. Spreewaldheide
8. Straupitz

== Demography ==
Development of Population since 1875 within the Current Boundaries (Blue Line: Population; Dotted Line: Comparison to Population Development of Brandenburg state; Grey Background: Time of Nazi rule; Red Background: Time of Communist rule)

Recent Population Development and Projections (Population Development before Census 2011 (blue line); Recent Population Development according to the Census in Germany in 2011 (blue bordered line); Official projections for 2005-2030 (yellow line); for 2020-2030 (green line); for 2017-2030 (scarlet line)

Amt Lieberose/Oberspreewald: Population development
within the current boundaries (2018)

Year	Pop.	±% p.a.
1875	12,817	—
1890	12,227	−0.31%
1910	11,345	−0.37%
1925	10,866	−0.29%
1933	10,500	−0.43%
1939	10,086	−0.67%
1946	15,431	+6.26%
1950	14,584	−1.40%
1964	11,359	−1.77%
1971	10,903	−0.58%

Year	Pop.	±% p.a.
1981	9,495	−1.37%
1985	9,223	−0.72%
1990	9,058	−0.36%
1995	8,960	−0.22%
2000	8,767	−0.43%
2005	8,270	−1.16%
2010	7,746	−1.30%
2015	7,245	−1.33%
2020	7,067	−0.50%
2025	6,860	−0.59%
