= Neu Zauche =

Neu Zauche/Nowa Niwa
- Municipality
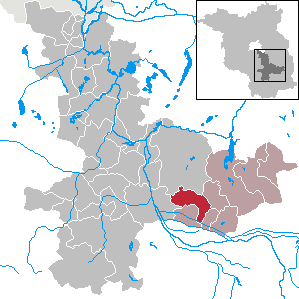
- Location of Neu Zauche/Nowa Niwa within Dahme-Spreewald district
- Interactive map of Neu Zauche/Nowa Niwa
- Location within Germany Location within Brandenburg
- Coordinates: 51°56′N 14°06′E
- Country: Germany
- State: Brandenburg
- District: Dahme-Spreewald
- Municipal assoc.: Lieberose/Oberspreewald

Government
  - Mayor (2024–29): Norbert Janetzki

Area
  - Total: 38.69 km^{2} (14.94 sq mi)
- Elevation: 55 m (180 ft)

Population (2025-12-31)
  - Total: 1,037
  - Density: 26.80/km^{2} (69.42/sq mi)
- Time zone: UTC+01:00 (CET)
  - Summer (DST): UTC+02:00 (CEST)
- Postal codes: 15913
- Dialling codes: 035475
- Vehicle registration: LDS

Neu Zauche (Lower Sorbian: Nowa Niwa, pronounced [ˈnɔwa ˈnʲiwa]) is a municipality in the district of Dahme-Spreewald in Brandenburg in Germany.

== Demography ==
Development of population since 1875 within the current boundaries (Blue line: Population; Dotted line: Comparison to population development of Brandenburg state; Grey background: Time of Nazi rule; Red background: Time of communist rule)

Neu Zauche: Population development
within the current boundaries (2017)

Year	Pop.	±% p.a.
1875	1,720	—
1890	1,714	−0.02%
1910	1,749	+0.10%
1925	1,649	−0.39%
1933	1,598	−0.39%
1939	1,510	−0.94%
1946	2,201	+5.53%
1950	1,999	−2.38%
1964	1,628	−1.46%
1971	1,551	−0.69%
1981	1,410	−0.95%
1985	1,339	−1.28%
1989	1,394	+1.01%
1990	1,392	−0.14%

Year	Pop.	±% p.a.
1991	1,368	−1.72%
1992	1,355	−0.95%
1993	1,341	−1.03%
1994	1,349	+0.60%
1995	1,332	−1.26%
1996	1,329	−0.23%
1997	1,341	+0.90%
1998	1,319	−1.64%
1999	1,323	+0.30%
2000	1,293	−2.27%
2001	1,285	−0.62%
2002	1,283	−0.16%
2003	1,270	−1.01%
2004	1,257	−1.02%

Year	Pop.	±% p.a.
2005	1,257	+0.00%
2006	1,244	−1.03%
2007	1,233	−0.88%
2008	1,228	−0.41%
2009	1,203	−2.04%
2010	1,160	−3.57%
2011	1,142	−1.55%
2012	1,125	−1.49%
2013	1,128	+0.27%
2014	1,126	−0.18%
2015	1,119	−0.62%
2016	1,111	−0.71%
2017	1,095	−1.44%

== People ==
- Kaspar Ludwig von Bredow (1685-1773), Prussian general
