= Straupitz (Spreewald) =

Straupitz (Spreewald) Tšupc (Błota)
- Municipality
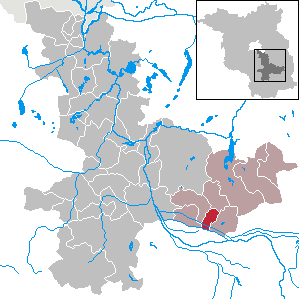
- Location of Straupitz (Spreewald) within Dahme-Spreewald district
- Interactive map of Straupitz (Spreewald)
- Location within Germany Location within Brandenburg
- Coordinates: 51°53′59″N 14°07′00″E
- Country: Germany
- State: Brandenburg
- District: Dahme-Spreewald
- Municipal assoc.: Lieberose/Oberspreewald

Government
  - Mayor (2024–29): Andre Urspruch

Area
  - Total: 21.64 km^{2} (8.36 sq mi)
- Elevation: 50 m (160 ft)

Population (2025-12-31)
  - Total: 906
  - Density: 41.9/km^{2} (108/sq mi)
- Demonym(s): German: Straupitzer; Lower Sorbian: Tšupcanaŕ (m.), Tšupcanaŕka (f.)
- Time zone: UTC+01:00 (CET)
  - Summer (DST): UTC+02:00 (CEST)
- Postal codes: 15913
- Dialling codes: 035475
- Vehicle registration: LDS
- Website: www.amt-lieberose-oberspreewald.de

Straupitz (Spreewald) (Lower Sorbian: Tšupc (Błota), pronounced [ˈtʃupts ˈbwɔta]) is a municipality in the district of Dahme-Spreewald in Brandenburg in Germany.

== Demography ==
Development of population since 1875 within the current boundaries (Blue line: Population; Dotted line: Comparison to population development of Brandenburg state; Grey background: Time of Nazi rule; Red background: Time of communist rule)

Straupitz: Population development
within the current boundaries (2017)

Year	Pop.	±% p.a.
1875	1,190	—
1890	1,278	+0.48%
1910	1,147	−0.54%
1925	1,106	−0.24%
1933	1,044	−0.72%
1939	963	−1.34%
1946	1,638	+7.88%
1950	1,648	+0.15%
1964	1,454	−0.89%
1971	1,502	+0.47%
1981	1,372	−0.90%
1985	1,327	−0.83%
1989	1,344	+0.32%
1990	1,333	−0.82%

Year	Pop.	±% p.a.
1991	1,311	−1.65%
1992	1,312	+0.08%
1993	1,299	−0.99%
1994	1,295	−0.31%
1995	1,293	−0.15%
1996	1,276	−1.31%
1997	1,236	−3.13%
1998	1,217	−1.54%
1999	1,203	−1.15%
2000	1,184	−1.58%
2001	1,163	−1.77%
2002	1,132	−2.67%
2003	1,115	−1.50%
2004	1,090	−2.24%

Year	Pop.	±% p.a.
2005	1,054	−3.30%
2006	1,042	−1.14%
2007	1,031	−1.06%
2008	999	−3.10%
2009	997	−0.20%
2010	988	−0.90%
2011	1,015	+2.73%
2012	993	−2.17%
2013	991	−0.20%
2014	1,000	+0.91%
2015	976	−2.40%
2016	952	−2.46%
2017	951	−0.11%
