= Spreewaldheide =

- Municipality
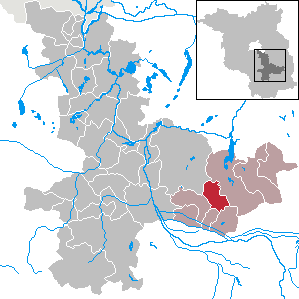
- Location of Spreewaldheide within Dahme-Spreewald district
- Interactive map of Spreewaldheide
- Location within Germany Location within Brandenburg
- Coordinates: 51°57′10″N 14°08′15″E
- Country: Germany
- State: Brandenburg
- District: Dahme-Spreewald
- Municipal assoc.: Lieberose/Oberspreewald

Government
  - Mayor (2024–29): Daniel Zimmer (CDU)

Area
  - Total: 35.99 km^{2} (13.90 sq mi)
- Elevation: 54 m (177 ft)

Population (2025-12-31)
  - Total: 424
  - Density: 11.8/km^{2} (30.5/sq mi)
- Time zone: UTC+01:00 (CET)
  - Summer (DST): UTC+02:00 (CEST)
- Postal codes: 15913
- Dialling codes: 035475
- Vehicle registration: LDS

Spreewaldheide (Lower Sorbian: Błośańska Góla) is a municipality in the district of Dahme-Spreewald in Brandenburg in Germany.

== Demography ==
Development of population since 1875 within the current boundaries (Blue line: Population; Dotted line: Comparison to population development of Brandenburg state; Grey background: Time of Nazi rule; Red background: Time of communist rule)

Spreewaldheide: Population development
within the current boundaries (2017)

Year	Pop.	±% p.a.
1875	1,064	—
1890	1,042	−0.14%
1910	1,014	−0.14%
1925	843	−1.22%
1933	783	−0.92%
1939	733	−1.09%
1946	1,141	+6.53%
1950	1,127	−0.31%
1964	871	−1.82%
1971	813	−0.98%
1981	672	−1.89%
1985	650	−0.83%
1989	603	−1.86%
1990	591	−1.99%

Year	Pop.	±% p.a.
1991	587	−0.68%
1992	589	+0.34%
1993	593	+0.68%
1994	585	−1.35%
1995	595	+1.71%
1996	604	+1.51%
1997	600	−0.66%
1998	616	+2.67%
1999	606	−1.62%
2000	617	+1.82%
2001	615	−0.32%
2002	608	−1.14%
2003	594	−2.30%
2004	580	−2.36%

Year	Pop.	±% p.a.
2005	569	−1.90%
2006	568	−0.18%
2007	567	−0.18%
2008	549	−3.17%
2009	531	−3.28%
2010	544	+2.45%
2011	499	−8.27%
2012	486	−2.61%
2013	485	−0.21%
2014	472	−2.68%
2015	464	−1.69%
2016	464	+0.00%
2017	480	+3.45%
