= Daniel Siemens =

German historian

Daniel Siemens is a German historian. He is the author of The Making of a Nazi Hero: The Murder and Myth of Horst Wessel, Metropole und Verbrechen and Stormtroopers: A New History of Hitler’s Brownshirts.
