= Byhleguhre-Byhlen =

Byhleguhre-Byhlen Běła Góra-Bělin
- Municipality
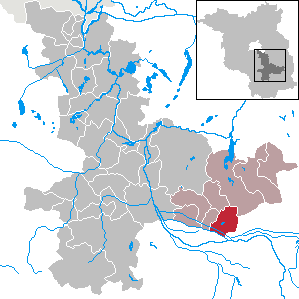
- Location of Byhleguhre-Byhlen within Dahme-Spreewald district
- Interactive map of Byhleguhre-Byhlen
- Location within Germany Location within Brandenburg
- Coordinates: 51°53′N 14°11′E
- Country: Germany
- State: Brandenburg
- District: Dahme-Spreewald
- Municipal assoc.: Lieberose/Oberspreewald

Government
  - Mayor (2024–29): Romeo Buder

Area
  - Total: 35.46 km^{2} (13.69 sq mi)
- Elevation: 55 m (180 ft)

Population (2025-12-31)
  - Total: 746
  - Density: 21.0/km^{2} (54.5/sq mi)
- Time zone: UTC+01:00 (CET)
  - Summer (DST): UTC+02:00 (CEST)
- Postal codes: 15913
- Dialling codes: 035475
- Vehicle registration: LDS
- Website: www.amt-lieberose- oberspreewald.de

Byhleguhre-Byhlen (Lower Sorbian: Běła Góra-Bělin) is a municipality in the district of Dahme-Spreewald in Brandenburg in Germany.

== Demography ==
Development of population since 1875 within the current boundaries (Blue line: Population; Dotted line: Comparison to population development of Brandenburg state; Grey background: Time of Nazi rule; Red background: Time of communist rule)

Byhleguhre-Byhlen: Population development
within the current boundaries (2020)

Year	Pop.	±% p.a.
1875	1,347	—
1890	1,331	−0.08%
1910	1,173	−0.63%
1925	1,158	−0.09%
1933	1,137	−0.23%
1939	1,155	+0.26%
1946	1,648	+5.21%
1950	1,548	−1.55%
1964	1,231	−1.62%
1971	1,159	−0.86%
1981	949	−1.98%
1985	933	−0.42%
1989	903	−0.81%
1990	894	−1.00%
1991	918	+2.68%

Year	Pop.	±% p.a.
1992	951	+3.59%
1993	938	−1.37%
1994	938	+0.00%
1995	935	−0.32%
1996	875	−6.42%
1997	877	+0.23%
1998	880	+0.34%
1999	886	+0.68%
2000	897	+1.24%
2001	888	−1.00%
2002	879	−1.01%
2003	873	−0.68%
2004	870	−0.34%
2005	856	−1.61%
2006	845	−1.29%

Year	Pop.	±% p.a.
2007	840	−0.59%
2008	825	−1.79%
2009	833	+0.97%
2010	807	−3.12%
2011	770	−4.58%
2012	770	+0.00%
2013	763	−0.91%
2014	775	+1.57%
2015	772	−0.39%
2016	742	−3.89%
2017	731	−1.48%
2018	732	+0.14%
2019	740	+1.09%
2020	753	+1.76%
