= Alt Zauche-Wußwerk =

Alt Zauche-Wußwerk Stara Niwa-Wózwjerch
- Municipality
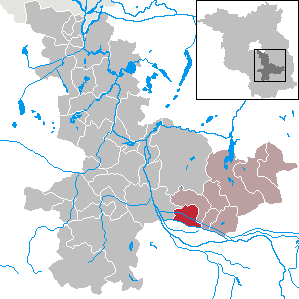
- Location of Alt Zauche-Wußwerk within Dahme-Spreewald district
- Interactive map of Alt Zauche-Wußwerk
- Location within Germany Location within Brandenburg
- Coordinates: 51°55′00″N 14°01′00″E
- Country: Germany
- State: Brandenburg
- District: Dahme-Spreewald
- Municipal assoc.: Lieberose/Oberspreewald

Government
  - Mayor (2024–29): Jens Martin

Area
  - Total: 33.02 km^{2} (12.75 sq mi)
- Elevation: 50 m (160 ft)

Population (2025-12-31)
  - Total: 483
  - Density: 14.6/km^{2} (37.9/sq mi)
- Time zone: UTC+01:00 (CET)
  - Summer (DST): UTC+02:00 (CEST)
- Postal codes: 15913
- Dialling codes: 03546, 035475
- Vehicle registration: LDS
- Website: www.amt-lieberose- oberspreewald.de

Alt Zauche-Wußwerk (Lower Sorbian: Stara Niwa-Wózwjerch) is a municipality in the district of Dahme-Spreewald in Brandenburg in Germany.

== Demography ==
Development of population since 1875 within the current boundaries (Blue line: Population; Dotted line: Comparison to population development of Brandenburg state; Grey background: Time of Nazi rule; Red background: Time of communist rule)

Alt Zauche-Wußwerk: Population development
within the current boundaries (2020)

Year	Pop.	±% p.a.
1875	973	—
1890	856	−0.85%
1910	801	−0.33%
1925	758	−0.37%
1933	755	−0.05%
1939	748	−0.16%
1946	1,117	+5.90%
1950	1,029	−2.03%
1964	790	−1.87%
1971	715	−1.41%
1981	663	−0.75%
1985	650	−0.49%
1989	645	−0.19%
1990	640	−0.78%
1991	634	−0.94%

Year	Pop.	±% p.a.
1992	676	+6.62%
1993	746	+10.36%
1994	735	−1.47%
1995	723	−1.63%
1996	633	−12.45%
1997	634	+0.16%
1998	633	−0.16%
1999	644	+1.74%
2000	628	−2.48%
2001	612	−2.55%
2002	619	+1.14%
2003	636	+2.75%
2004	610	−4.09%
2005	602	−1.31%
2006	590	−1.99%

Year	Pop.	±% p.a.
2007	589	−0.17%
2008	573	−2.72%
2009	558	−2.62%
2010	551	−1.25%
2011	523	−5.08%
2012	522	−0.19%
2013	515	−1.34%
2014	506	−1.75%
2015	502	−0.79%
2016	504	+0.40%
2017	488	−3.17%
2018	485	−0.61%
2019	483	−0.41%
2020	465	−3.73%
