= Wiesengrund =

Wiesengrund Łukojce
- Municipality
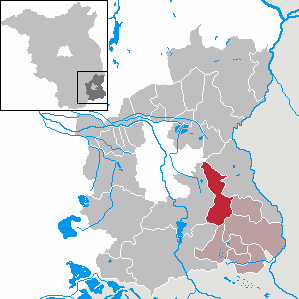
- Location of Wiesengrund within Spree-Neiße district
- Interactive map of Wiesengrund
- Location within Germany Location within Brandenburg
- Coordinates: 51°42′00″N 14°34′00″E
- Country: Germany
- State: Brandenburg
- District: Spree-Neiße
- Municipal assoc.: Döbern-Land
- Subdivisions: 5 Ortsteile

Government
  - Mayor (2024–29): Norman Schlüter

Area
  - Total: 50.08 km^{2} (19.34 sq mi)
- Elevation: 87 m (285 ft)

Population (2025-12-31)
  - Total: 1,310
  - Density: 26.2/km^{2} (67.7/sq mi)
- Time zone: UTC+01:00 (CET)
  - Summer (DST): UTC+02:00 (CEST)
- Postal codes: 03149
- Dialling codes: 035694, 035695
- Vehicle registration: SPN

Wiesengrund (Lower Sorbian Łukojce) is a municipality in the district of Spree-Neiße, in Lower Lusatia, Brandenburg, Germany.

== History ==
From 1815 to 1947, the constituent localities of Wiesengrund were part of the Prussian Province of Brandenburg. From 1952 to 1990, they were part of the Bezirk Cottbus of East Germany. On 31 December 2001, the municipality of Wiesengrund was formed by merging the municipalities of Gahry, Gosda, Jethe, Mattendorf and Trebendorf.

== Demography ==
Development of Population since 1875 within the Current Boundaries (Blue Line: Population; Dotted Line: Comparison to Population Development of Brandenburg state; Grey Background: Time of Nazi rule; Red Background: Time of Communist rule)

Wiesengrund: Population development
within the current boundaries (2013)

| Year | Pop. | ±% p.a. |
|---|---|---|
| 1875 | 2,046 | — |
| 1890 | 2,016 | −0.10% |
| 1910 | 2,135 | +0.29% |
| 1925 | 2,281 | +0.44% |
| 1933 | 2,245 | −0.20% |
| 1939 | 2,277 | +0.24% |
| 1946 | 2,848 | +3.25% |
| 1950 | 2,904 | +0.49% |
| 1964 | 2,522 | −1.00% |
| 1971 | 2,381 | −0.82% |
| 1981 | 1,658 | −3.55% |
| 1985 | 1,546 | −1.73% |
| 1989 | 1,521 | −0.41% |
| 1990 | 1,508 | −0.85% |
| 1991 | 1,493 | −0.99% |
| 1992 | 1,489 | −0.27% |
| 1993 | 1,489 | +0.00% |
| 1994 | 1,496 | +0.47% |
| 1995 | 1,548 | +3.48% |
| 1996 | 1,594 | +2.97% |

| Year | Pop. | ±% p.a. |
|---|---|---|
| 1997 | 1,637 | +2.70% |
| 1998 | 1,675 | +2.32% |
| 1999 | 1,688 | +0.78% |
| 2000 | 1,705 | +1.01% |
| 2001 | 1,696 | −0.53% |
| 2002 | 1,692 | −0.24% |
| 2003 | 1,675 | −1.00% |
| 2004 | 1,660 | −0.90% |
| 2005 | 1,686 | +1.57% |
| 2006 | 1,636 | −2.97% |
| 2007 | 1,609 | −1.65% |
| 2008 | 1,593 | −0.99% |
| 2009 | 1,566 | −1.69% |
| 2010 | 1,516 | −3.19% |
| 2011 | 1,461 | −3.63% |
| 2012 | 1,444 | −1.16% |
| 2013 | 1,419 | −1.73% |
| 2014 | 1,382 | −2.61% |
| 2015 | 1,390 | +0.58% |
| 2016 | 1,375 | −1.08% |

== Subdivisions ==
The city districts are:

- Gahry (Gari)
- Gosda I (Gózna)
  - Dubrau (Dubrawa)
  - Klinge (Klinka)
- Jethe (Jaty)
  - Smarso (Smaržow)
- Mattendorf (Matyjojce)
- Trebendorf (Trjebejce)

The Mattendorf district (Matyjojce) is a designated Sorbian settlement area (Sorbisches Siedlungsgebiet).
