= Möllen (Friedland) =

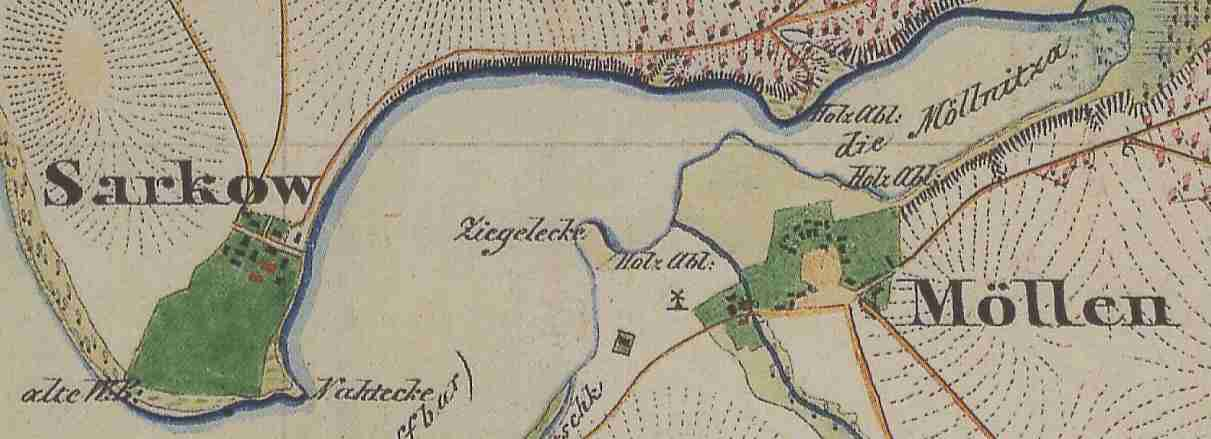
Map of Möllen and Sarkow, 1846

Möllen (Lower Sorbian: Mólin) is a residential area in the district of Niewisch in Friedland in the district Oder-Spree (Brandenburg).

It is close to Lake Schwielochsee, and at times it has been considered as one of the Schwielochsee villages.

== History ==
The first historical mention of Möllen was in 1574 when it was in the possession of Joachim II. The name is most likely derived from the Sorb term měl = shallows.
