= Stützle =

Stützle is a German surname. Notable people with the surname include:

- Ingo Stützle (born 1976), German political scientist
- Monika Stützle (born 1953), German speed skater
- Tim Stützle (born 2002), German professional ice hockey player
