= Gerhard Pohl =

German politician (1937–2012)

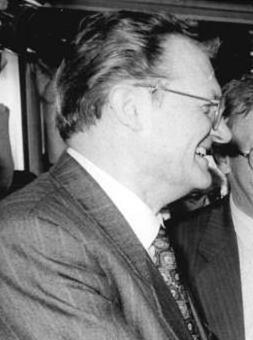
- Pohl in 1990

Minister for Economics of the German Democratic Republic
- In office 12 April 1990 – 16 August 1990
- Prime Minister: Lothar de Maizière
- Preceded by: Christa Luft
- Succeeded by: Helmut Haussmann (after German reunification)

Personal details
- Born: 16 August 1937 Guben, Province of Brandenburg, Nazi Germany
- Died: 30 May 2012 (aged 74) Schwielochsee, Brandenburg, Germany
- Party: CDU (East Germany)
- Education: Dresden University of Technology
- Profession: Engineering economist

Gerhard Pohl (16 August 1937 – 30 May 2012) was a German politician and a member of the East German CDU. He served as Minister of Economics from April to August 1990, in the cabinet of Lothar de Maizière.

== Career ==
=== Education ===
Pohl held a diplom in engineering economics from the Dresden University of Technology. He was a member of the East German People's Chamber from 1981 to 1990.

== Death ==
Pohl died on 30 May 2012 after drowning near his home of East Germany.
