= Rudolf Hickel =

German economist and author (born 1942)

- Born: 17 January 1942; Nuremberg, Franken, Germany
- Education: Tübingen; Konstanz
- Occupations: Economist; Author; University professor
- Employer: University of Bremen
- Spouse: Sabine Mohaupt-Hickel

Rudolf Hickel is a German economist and author. He transferred to the University of Bremen in 1971, accepting the chair in "Finanzwissenschaft" (loosely, "public finance") in 1993. Between 2001 and 2009 he served as director of the university's Institute for Labour and Economics ("Institut Arbeit und Wirtschaft" / IAW). A long standing critic of developments in western Market Capitalism since the 1980s, he engaged in economic debates after the 2008 financial crisis. Hickel is a founding member of the Arbeitsgruppe Alternative Wirtschaftspolitik.

== Biography ==
=== Provenance and early years ===
Rudolf Hickel was born into a Catholic family in Nuremberg at the height of the Second World War. He shares his name with his father, who was the concertmaster ("in English-language terms, leader of the orchestra") with the Warsaw Philharmonic Orchestra. Hickel grew up in Bad Wildbad, a little town in south-west Germany which after 1945 became part of the French occupation zone and then, in May 1949, of the German Federal Republic (West Germany). He attended middle school locally. He still keeps, in a case of memorabilia, the quarter-sized violin he used for his violin lessons when he was small, even though he was not permitted to play the instrument at home: "... wrong notes put my father in a white sweat". (Note: "Die falschen Töne haben meinen Vater zur Weißglut gebracht") He attended school at the business oriented secondary school ("Wirtschaftsgymnasium") in nearby Pforzheim, and it was here that he passed his "Abitur" (school finals), opening the way for progression to university-level education. A Catholic upbringing left him critical of the pope on many fronts, but he would always be grateful that the church financed his studies with a scholarship. Otherwise, as he told an interviewer in 2011, "at home there was no money".

=== Student years ===
Rainer Hickel, his younger brother, would build a career as a professional musician, but it seems to have been accepted by the time he left school that Rudolf Hickel would follow another path. Between 1962 and 1967 he studied Economics on a Cusanuswerk stipendium at the University of Tübingen, from which he earned a "Dipl. Volkswirt" degree in (loosely) Applied Economics. He remained at Tübingen as a research assistant for a further two years, with a focus on Economic Theory. That was followed by a period as a research assistant at the newly inaugurated University of Konstanz during 1969/70, where he was involved in building up the Economics department. It was from the University of Konstanz that in 1970 he received his doctorate in return for a topical piece of work entitled "Ein neuer Typ der Akkumulation" (loosely, "A new kind of capital accumulation").

=== Bremen ===
Shortly after that Hickel accepted a professorship in "Politische Ökonomie" (loosely, "Political economics") at the University of Bremen, relocating north in 1971. His focus was on public finances. The university at Bremen, like that at Konstanz, was newly established: Rudolf Hickel has played a key role in establishing and building up the Economics department. In 1973 he accepted a professorship in Public finance. In 1975 he was a co-founder and became a member of the new West German "Working Group for Alternative Economic Policy". The working group submits annual alternative reports to the so-called West German Council of Economic Experts ("Sachverständigenrat zur Begutachtung der gesamtwirtschaftlichen Entwicklung"). It is in this connection that Hickel served for many years as a co-producer of the counter-opinion memorandum to the Council of Experts during the first week of each May.

In 1993 he accepted the teaching chair in Finance at the University of Bremen. That year he also accepted an appointment as mediator on behalf of the union side in the Metal workers' wage negotiations in Saxony.

Between November 2001 and September 2009 Rudolf Hickel served as director of the university Institute for Labour and Economics ("Institut Arbeit und Wirtschaft" / IAW). He was succeeded in the post by Günter Warsewa.

=== Beyond Bremen ===
In 1989 Hickel became co-producer of the political-economic monthly Berlin-produced magazine Leviathan and of Blätter für deutsche und internationale Politik. His submissions continue to appear frequently in the latter. During the summer term of 1990 he delivered a lecture series at Berlin University on the theme of "Market Functions and Market Failures - Underpinnings of a Mixed Economy" ("Marktfunktionen und Marktversagen – Grundlagen einer gemischten Wirtschaft"), which set the course for much of his subsequent output.

In 1990 Hickel teamed up with Heiner Heseler to publish an important written opinion-piece under the title "Der maritime Sektor im Umbruch: wirtschaftsstrukturelle und beschäftigungspolitische Vorschläge für Rostock" (loosely, "The Maritime Sector in transition: proposals for Rostock on economic structures and employment policies". 1990 was the year of reunification: Rostock, like Bremen, is a major port, but had been part of "the other Germany", beyond the "Inner German border" since 1949. Many thoughtful Germans remained preoccupied with the dilemmas created by reunification for some years after 1990. In 1991 Rudolf Hickel shared some of his thoughts in his book "Der Preis der Einheit" ("The Cost of Unity"), co-authored with Jan Priewe.

Since 1997, Hickel has taken turns with Robert Kurz, Christa Luft, and Harry Nick as the author of a column on economic policy in Neues Deutschland, which before 1989 was the mass-circulation party newspaper of East Germany's ruling party, and has since become an important left-leaning daily newspaper in Germany. He also continues to contribute robustly and regularly in the Frankfurter Rundschau, Junge Welt and Tageszeitung.

Hickel is a member of the economics advisory committee at ATTAC, an international (originally Paris-based) activist organisation opposed to abusive aspects of globalization. His sat as a member of the supervisory board at Salzgitter AG, a major steel producer, between 1984 and 2008, and also for many years at GEWOBA, a north German construction business headquartered in Bremen and specialising in residential tower blocks. In both cases he sat as a representative of the company employees. Hickel was also on the supervisory board at the vast Allianz insurance and banking conglomerate between 1998 and 2006, a period that included the conversion of the Allianz holding company into a pan-European "Societas Europaea".

== Approach ==
Hickel favours a demand driven approach to economic policy and is regarded by commentators (and by himself) as a Post-Keynesian. During long years of political argument on the matter, he was a firm supporter of a state-mandated minimum wage (which was implemented in Germany, at the insistence of the SPD as a price for joining a government coalition, in 2015), asserting that Germany has an "internationally competitive economy, which can support a high level of wages because of its growing productivity". (Note: "...eine international wettbewerbsstarke Wirtschaft, die wegen ihrer wachsenden Produktivität auch ein auch ein hohes Lohnniveau verträgt".) The labour market reforms launched in 2003 by Chancellor Schröder and carried through by his successor, known collectively as Agenda 2010, seriously held back the cyclical economic recovery that took place between 2005 and 2007, because they placed downward pressure on wages which in turn reduced consumption. It is, according to Hickel, wrong to hold back wages and thereby domestic demand: a competitive cycle of wage cuts would be economically very damaging to Germany. It would be preferable for the country to focus on innovation in order to survive in a competitive global economy. Furthermore, government to pursue a supply oriented economic strategy would favour a "casino capitalism" and so hinder the creation of high productivity high value jobs in the country.

== Critics ==
Some were (and are) unpersuaded by Hickel's advocacy of a demand driven approach. Critical supply-side economists included the liberal Hans-Werner Sinn, who sharply attacked Hickel's backing of a cut on working hours with no corresponding cut in wages. Sinn also rejected Hickel's assertion that Germany's stubbornly high (at that time) unemployment was simply a business cycle problem that could be resolved through increased public spending.

== Celebration ==
In 2017 Rudolf Hickel was honoured by the senate with the Medal for Arts and Humanities of the Free Hanseatic City [of Bremen].

== Output (selection) ==
- Zerschlagt die Banken. Zivilisiert die Finanzmärkte. Econ 2012, ISBN 978-3-430-20141-4.
- Kassensturz. Sieben Gründe für eine andere Wirtschaftspolitik. Hamburg 2006 (Buchbesprechung im Deutschlandfunk).
- Sozialstaat im Abbruch. Die neoliberale Offensive. Kritik und Alternativen. Hamburg 2004, ISBN 3-89458-227-8.
- Die Risikospirale. Was bleibt von der New Economy? Eichborn-Verlag 2001, ISBN 3821839031.
- Brauchen wir eine andere Wirtschaft? Rowohlt, Reinbek 2001, ISBN 3-499-23045-3.
- Politik des Kapitals, heute (with Klaus Peter Kisker, Harald Mattfeldt). VSA-Verlag, 2000, ISBN 3879757771 (based on Jörg Huffschmid: Die Politik des Kapitals von 1969).
- Standortwahn und Euro-Angst. Die sieben Irrtümer der deutschen Wirtschaftspolitik. Reinbek 1998, ISBN 349922237X.
- Preis der Einheit. Bilanz und Perspektiven der deutschen Einigung (with Jan Priewe). Frankfurt am Main 1994 (translated, notably, into Korean).
- Millionen Arbeitslose (with Harald Mattfeldt). Rowohlt TB-V., Reinbek 1986, ISBN 3499153386.
- Die Finanzkrise des Steuerstaates – Beiträge zur politischen Ökonomie der Staatsfinanzen. (Rudolf Goldscheid, Joseph Schumpeter, Hrsg. Rudolf Hickel), edition Suhrkamp 1976.
- Tarifliche Lohnpolitik unter Nutzung der Härtefallregelung (zus. mit W. Kurtzke). Köln 1967.
