= Spree (river) =

River in Germany and the Czech Republic

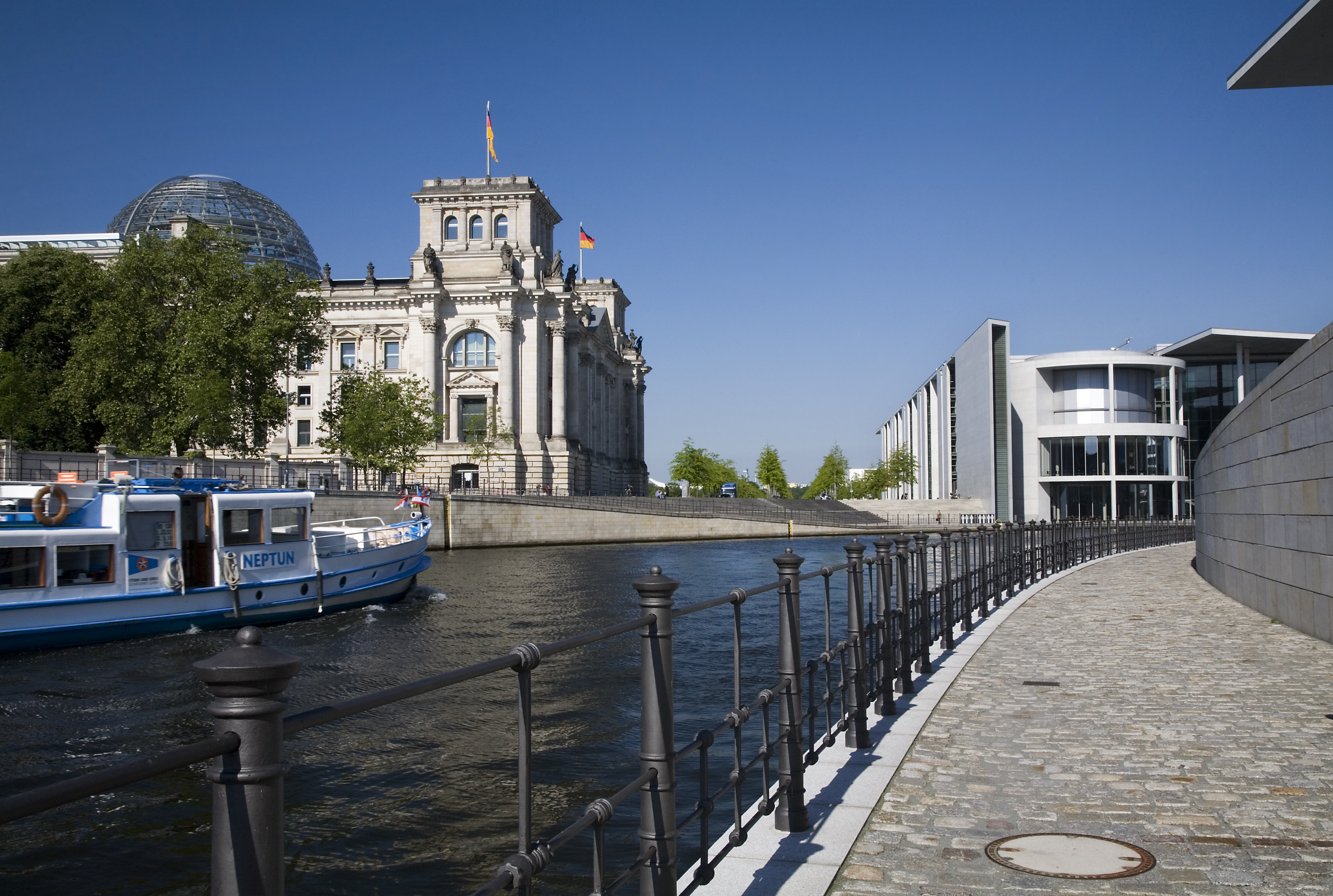
- The Spree in Berlin, Reichstag building to the left, Paul Löbe House to the right
- Native name: Sprjewja (Sorbian languages); Spréva (Czech)

Location
- Countries: Czech Republic; Germany
- Cities: Bautzen; Cottbus; Berlin

Physical characteristics
- Source
  - location: Upper Lusatia
- Mouth: Havel
  - location: Berlin-Spandau
  - coordinates: 52°32′10″N 13°12′31″E
- Length: about 400 km (250 mi)
- Basin size: 10,105 km^{2} (3,902 sq mi)
- Discharge
  - average: 36 m^{3}/s (1,300 cu ft/s)

Basin features
- Progression: Havel→ Elbe→ North Sea

The Spree (English: /ʃpreɪ, spreɪ/ S(H)PRAY, German: [ʃpʁeː]; Sorbian languages: Sprjewja, Lower Sorbian: [ˈsprʲɛwʲa], Upper Sorbian: [ˈspʁʲɛwʲa]; in Lower Sorbian also called Rěka, lit. 'The River'; Czech: Spréva) is a river in Germany and the Czech Republic. With a length of approximately 400 kilometres (250 mi), it is the main tributary of the Havel River. The Spree is much longer than the Havel, which it flows into at Berlin-Spandau; the Havel then flows into the Elbe at Havelberg. The river rises in the Lusatian Highlands, in the Lusatian part of Saxony, where it has three sources: the historical one called Spreeborn in the village of Spreedorf, the water-richest one in Neugersdorf, and the highest elevated one in Eibau. The Spree then flows northwards through Upper and Lower Lusatia, where it crosses the border between Saxony and Brandenburg. After passing through Cottbus, it forms the Spree Forest (German: Spreewald), a large inland delta and biosphere reserve. It then flows through Lake Schwielochsee before entering Berlin, as Müggelspree (pronounced [ˈmʏɡl̩ˌʃpʁeː]).

The Spree is the main river of Berlin, Brandenburg, Lusatia, and the settlement area of the Sorbs, who call the river Sprjewja; the name derives ultimately from Proto-Germanic *spreutaną 'to spring forth'. For a very short distance close to its sources, the Spree constitutes, as Spréva, the border between Germany and the Czech Republic. The Spree's longest tributaries are Dahme (confluence in Berlin-Köpenick) and Schwarzer Schöps (Čorny Šepc; confluence in Boxberg/O.L.-Sprey), other well-known tributaries (since they are Berlin rivers) are Panke and Wuhle.

== Course ==
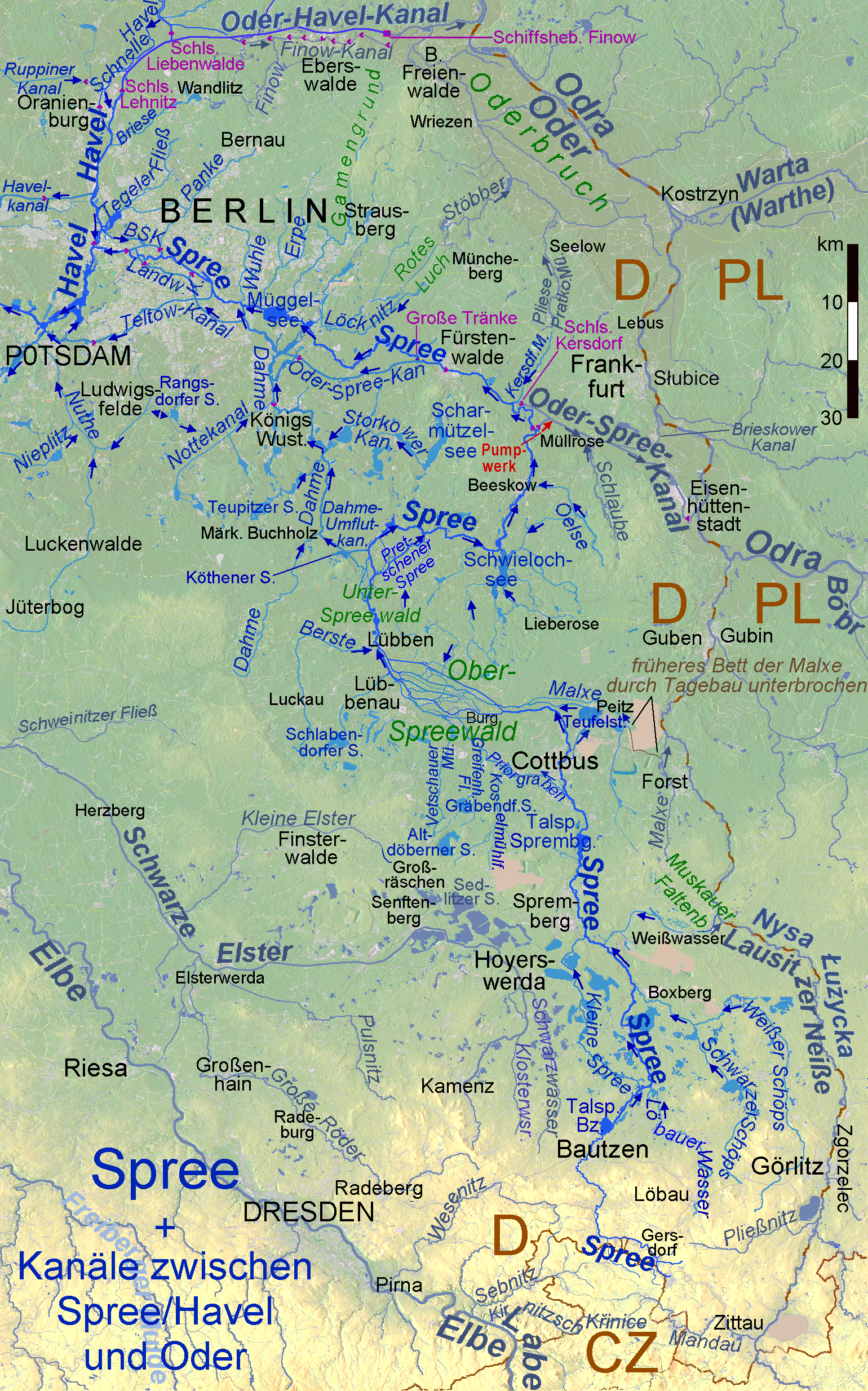
Course of Spree River with its natural and artificial affluents and branches. In addition the canals joining the Spree and Havel river system to Oder River.

It rises in the Lusatian Mountains and flows north through Bautzen and Spremberg.

In the Spreewald the river passes through the towns of Lübbenau, Lübben and Leibsch. Just below Leibsch, the Dahme Flood Relief Canal diverts water from the Spree to run into the River Dahme at Märkisch Buchholz. The Spree continues north from Leibsch before flowing into the Neuendorfer Sea at the northern edge of the Spreewald. From the Neundorfer See it then flows in an easterly direction to the Schwielochsee, and then in a northerly and westerly direction to the town of Fürstenwalde. From Fürstenwalde the river continues to flow westwards, through the Dämeritzsee and Müggelsee, to Köpenick in the southeastern part of Berlin, where it is joined by its tributary, the River Dahme.

The final reach of the Spree is where it is best known. It flows through the city centre of Berlin to join the River Havel in Spandau, Berlin's westernmost borough, which itself ultimately merges with the Elbe to enter the sea in Cuxhaven, after flowing through Hamburg. On its route through Berlin, the river passes Berlin Cathedral (Berliner Dom), the Reichstag and the Schloss Charlottenburg. The renowned Museum Island (Museumsinsel), with its collection of five major museums, is an island in the Spree.

In 2004 the Badeschiff floating swimming pool opened on the Spree in Berlin.

== Navigation ==
Small craft, such as punts, are widely used in wetlands of the Spreewald. Larger craft can reach as far upstream as Leibsch, although the upper reaches are relatively shallow and are generally used only by leisure craft. Some intermediate reaches are unnavigable and bypassed by canals.

For a stretch of about 20 kilometres (12 mi) east of and flowing through Fürstenwalde, the river forms part of the Oder-Spree Canal. On this reach, and on the reach west of the confluence with the River Dahme at Köpenick, the river forms part of secondary commercial link between Berlin and the River Oder and hence Poland. The canal diverges from the Spree just east of Fürstenwalde and later joins the River Dahme at the (lake) Seddinsee.

In Berlin, the Spree forms part of a dense network of navigable waterways, many of which are artificial, and which provide a wide choice of routes. Several important commercial harbors can be found on this network, and tugs and barges move sand, grain, bricks, and beer. Tour boats frequently tour the central section of the Spree and its adjoining waterways.

== Berlin Wall ==
Many people died in the Spree during the Cold War while trying to cross the Berlin Wall, including children who drowned when rescuers were not allowed to enter the river to save them.

== Gallery ==
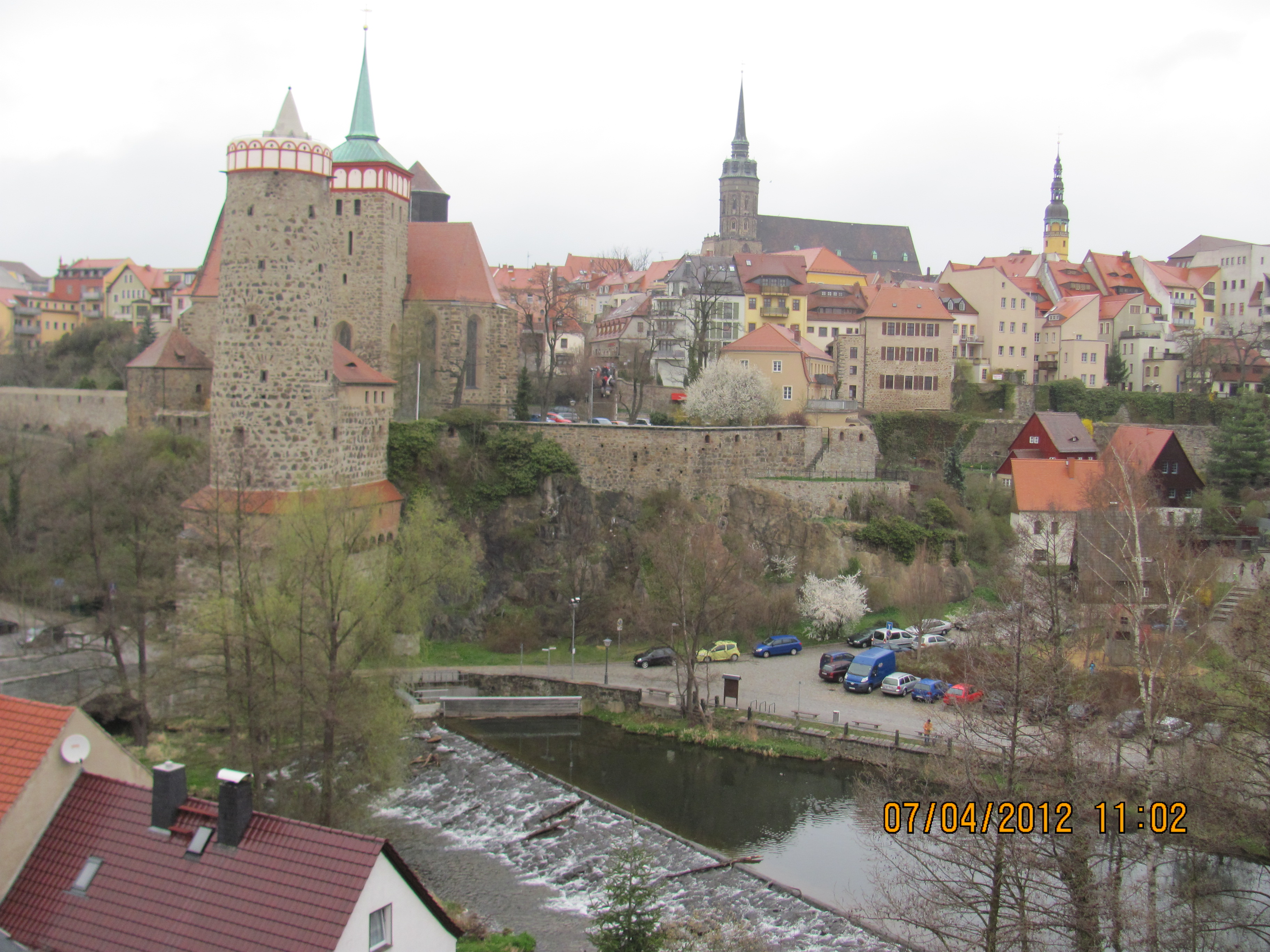
Spree in Bautzen

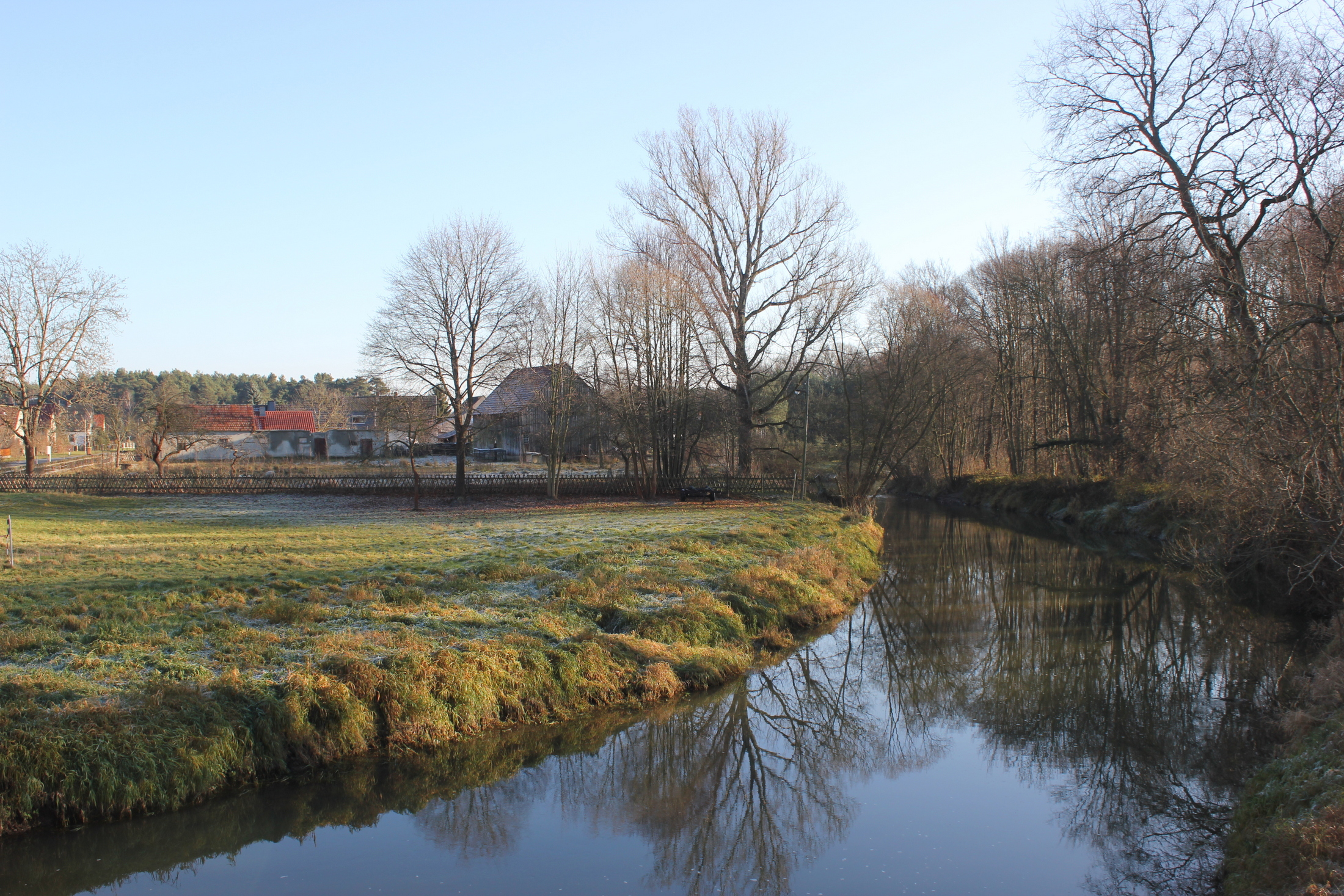
Spree north of Bautzen

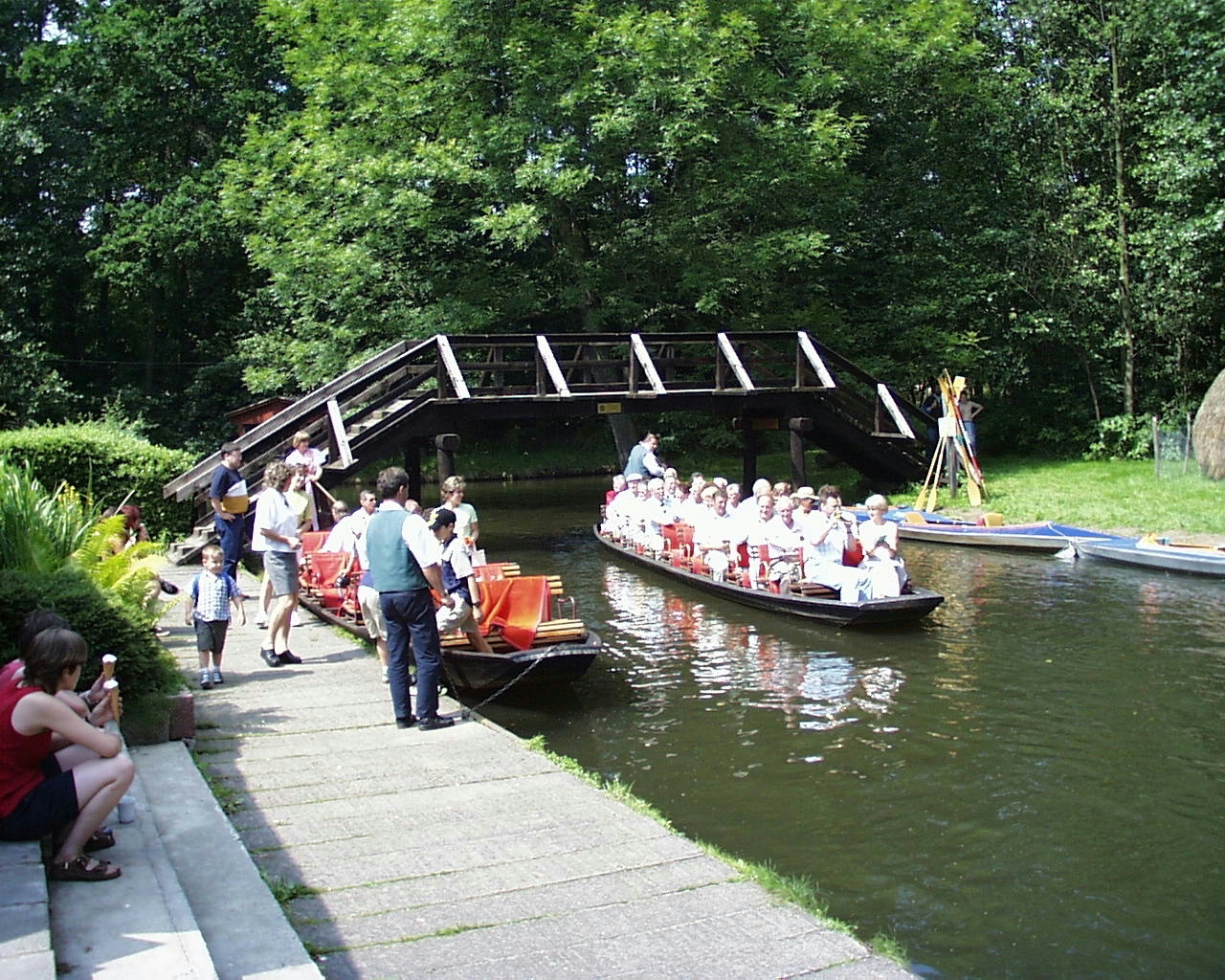
Spree in the Spreewald

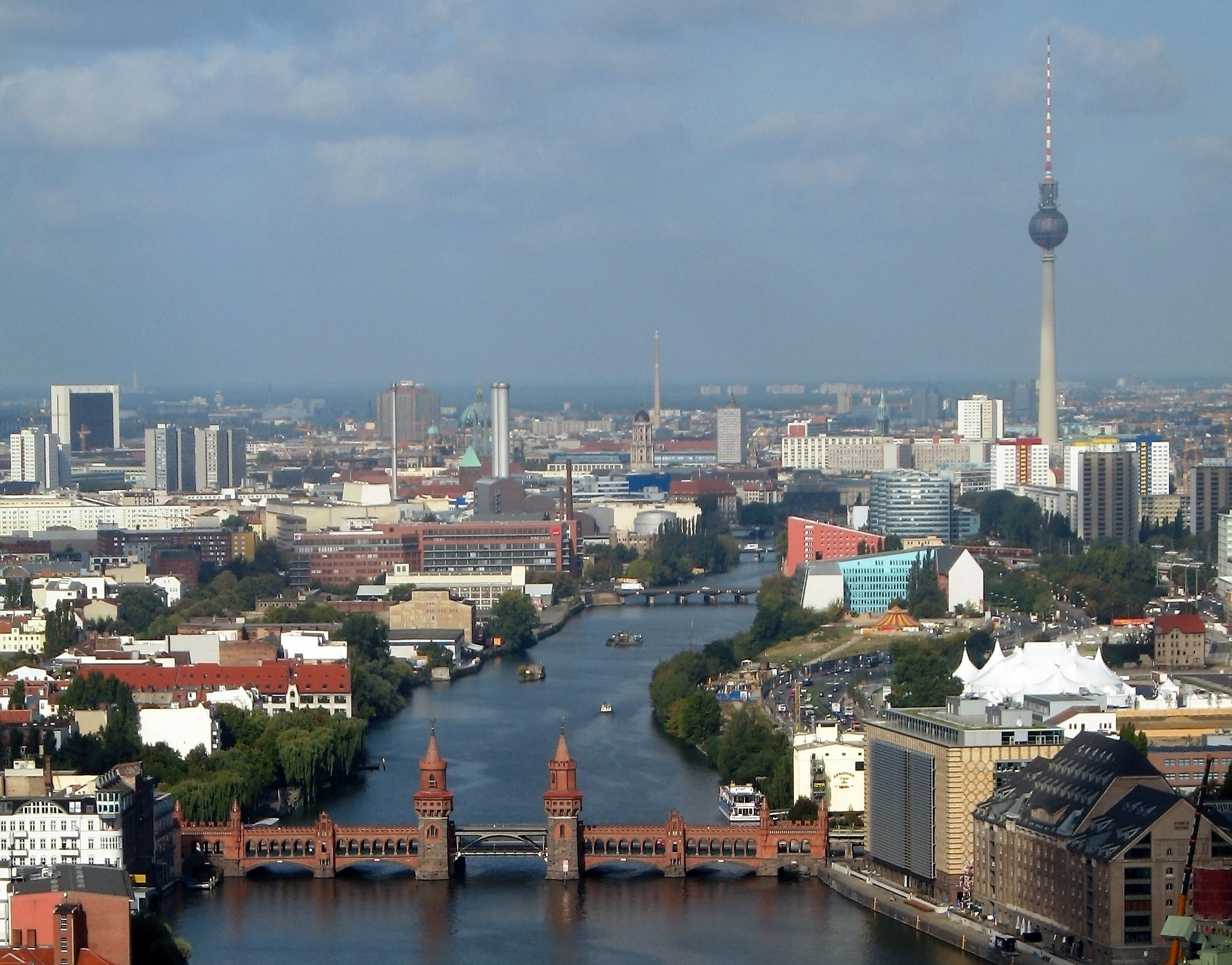
Spree in central Berlin, with Oberbaum Bridge

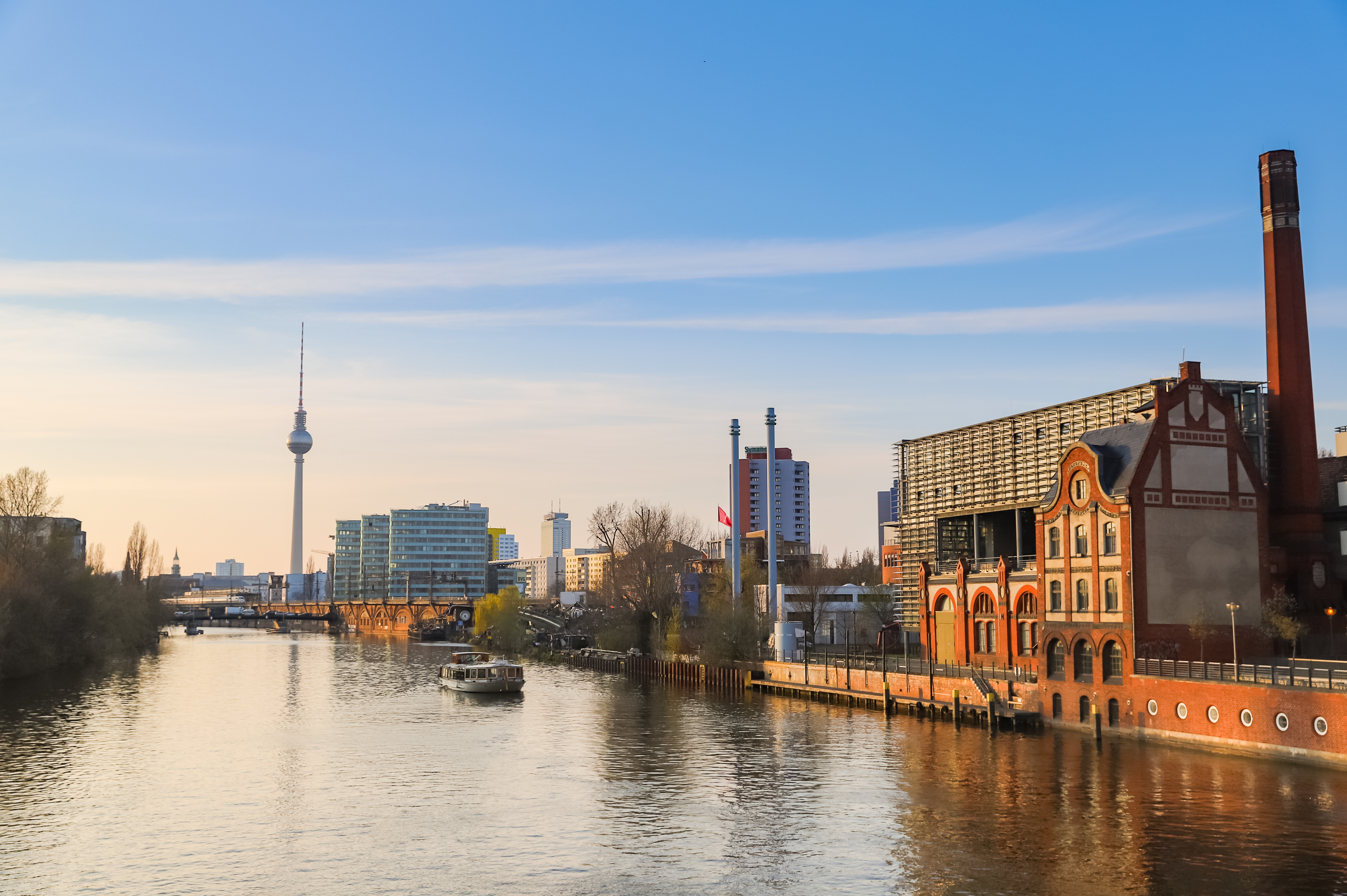
Spree Shore in Berlin Friedrichshain

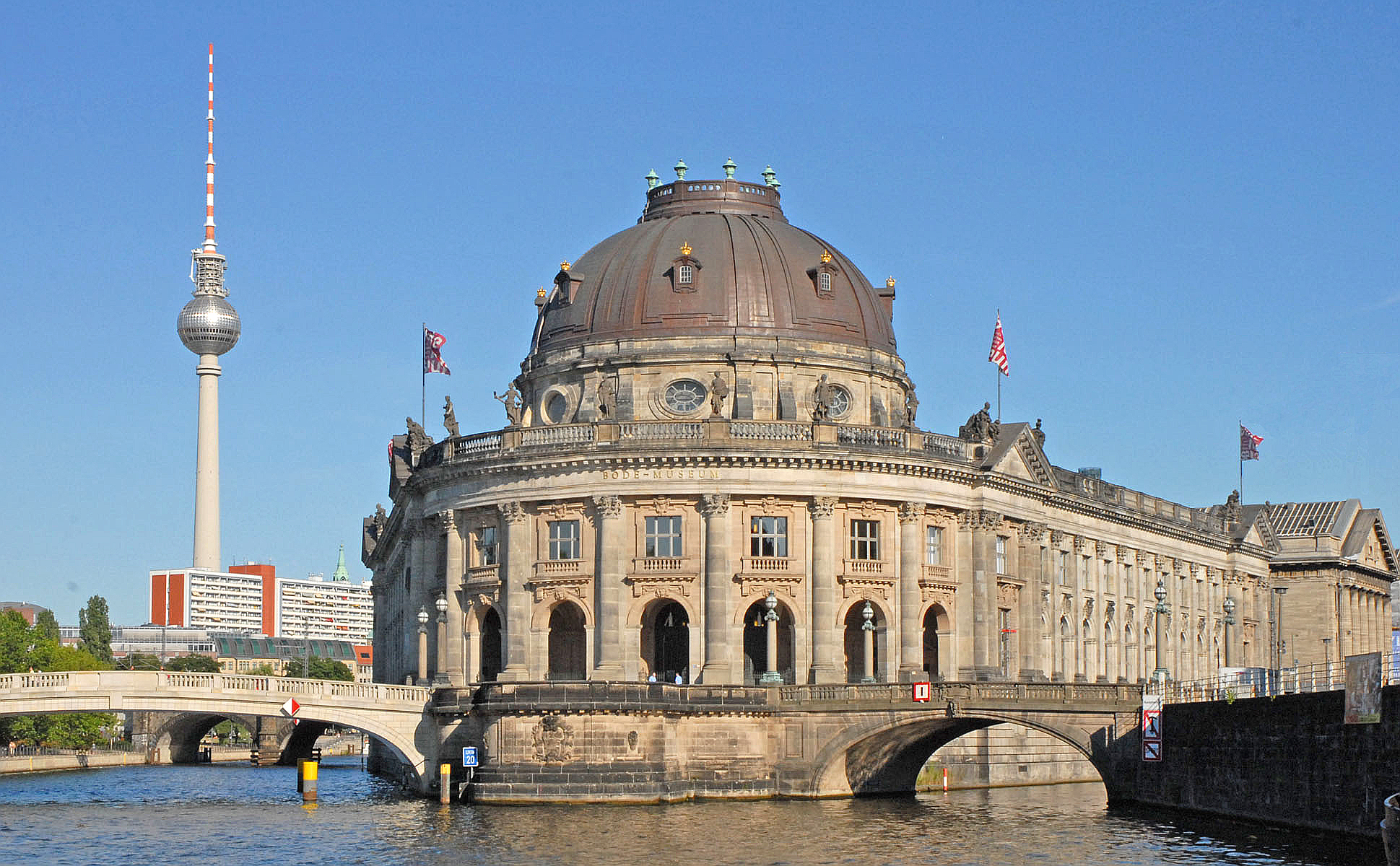
Bode Museum at the tip of Museum Island in the Spree

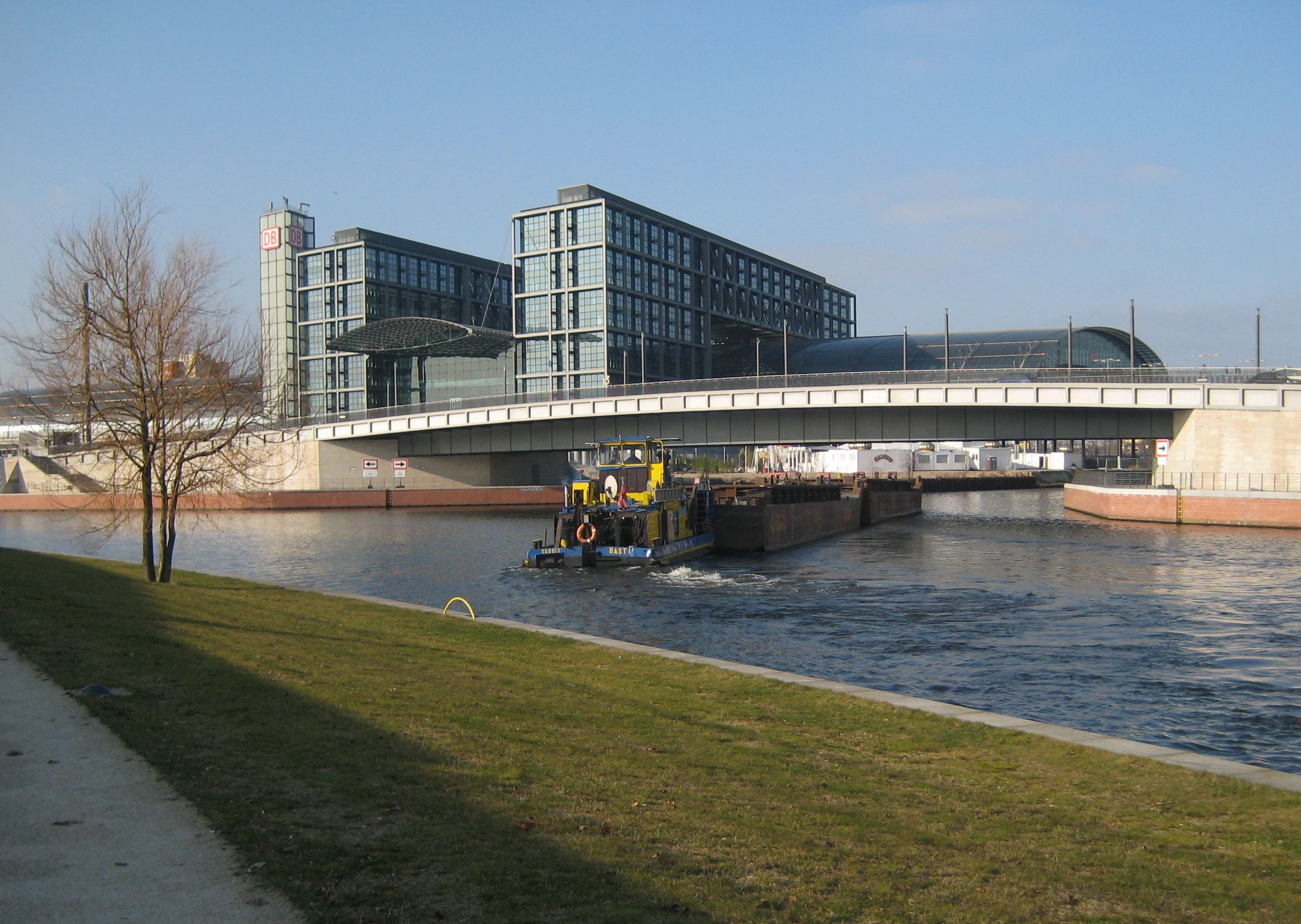
Spree with Berlin Hauptbahnhof & the entrance of a canal

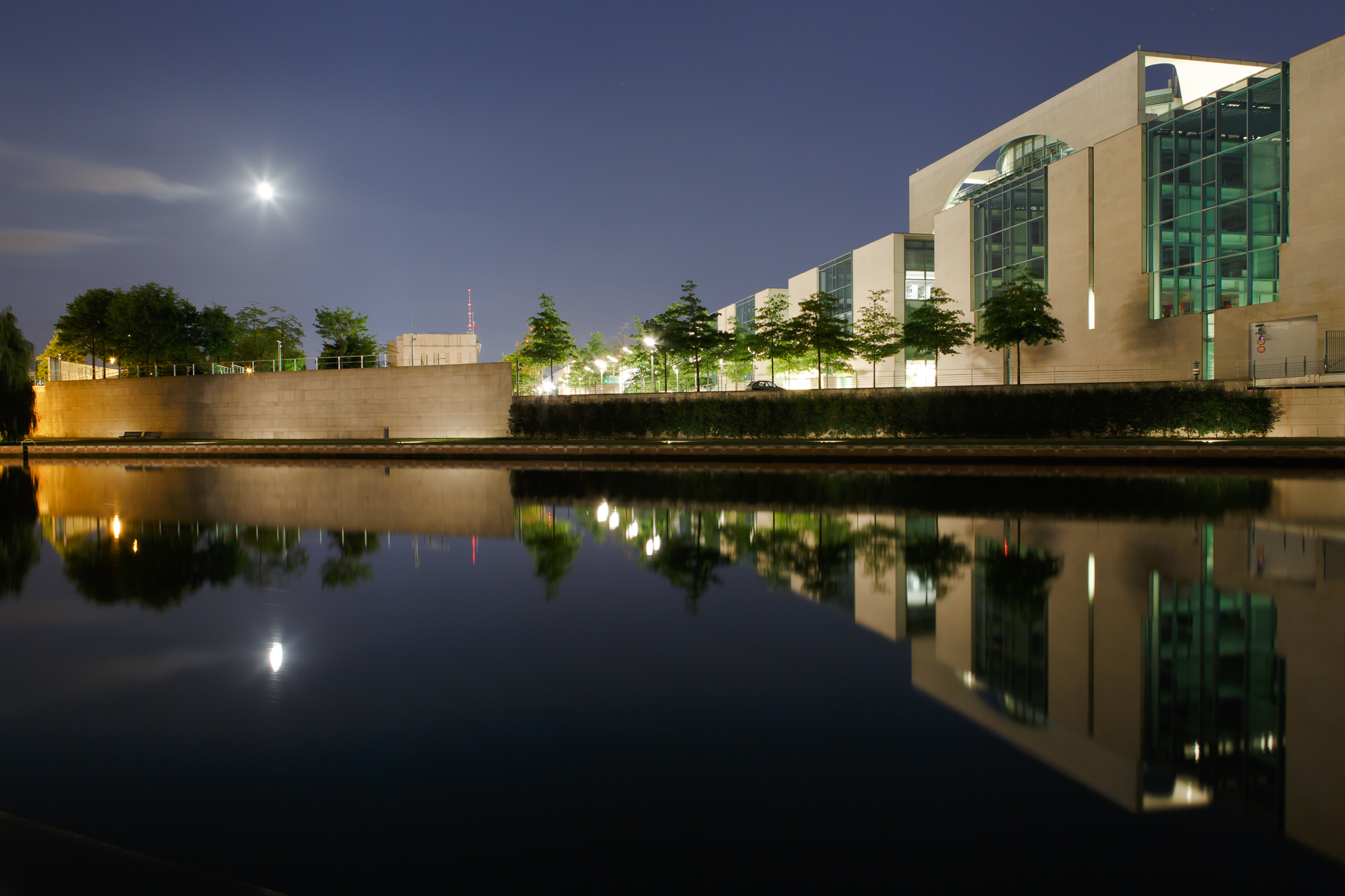
The Federal Chancellery (Berlin) on the Spree

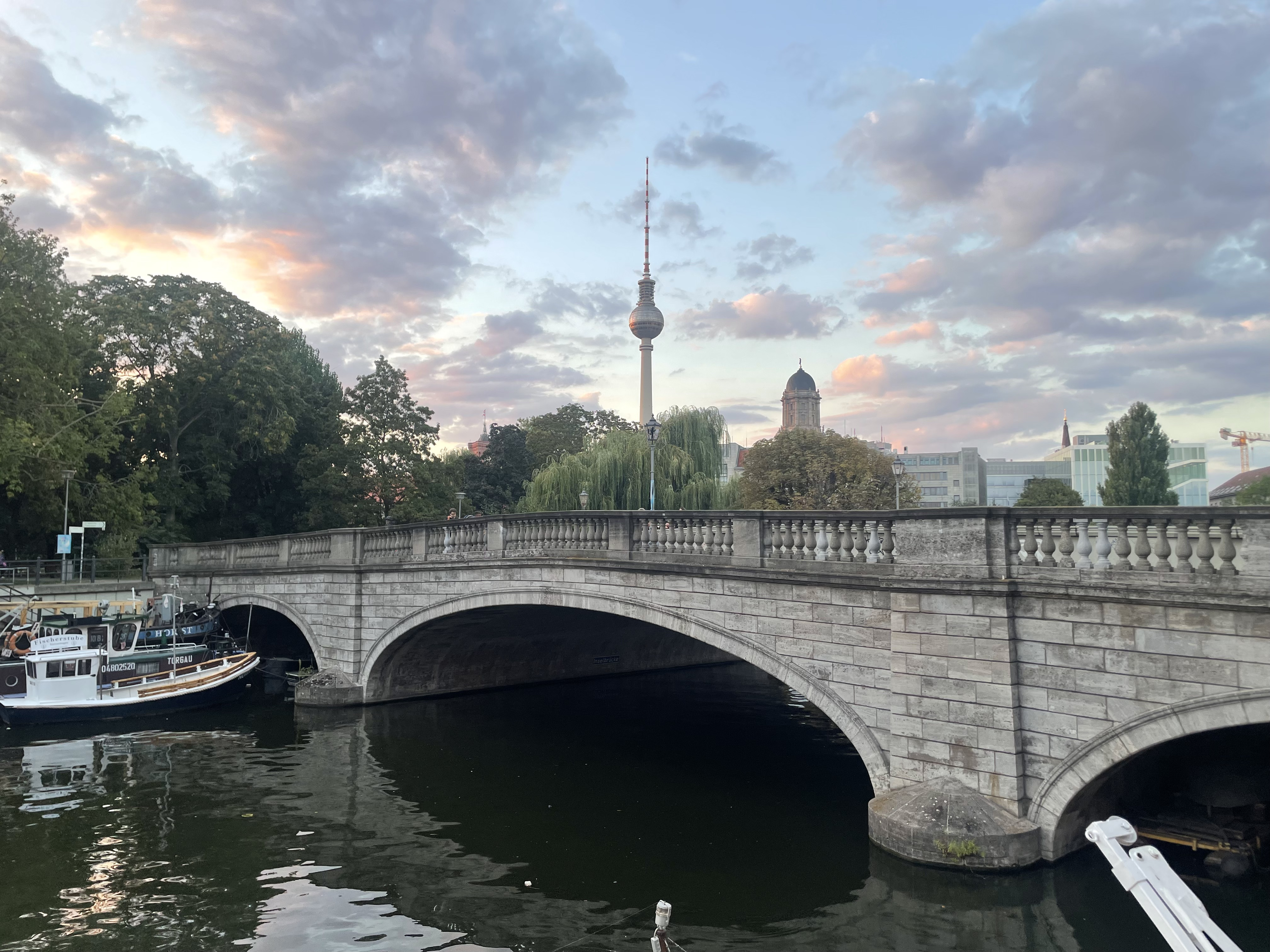
Spree in Mitte with view of Fernsehturm Berlin

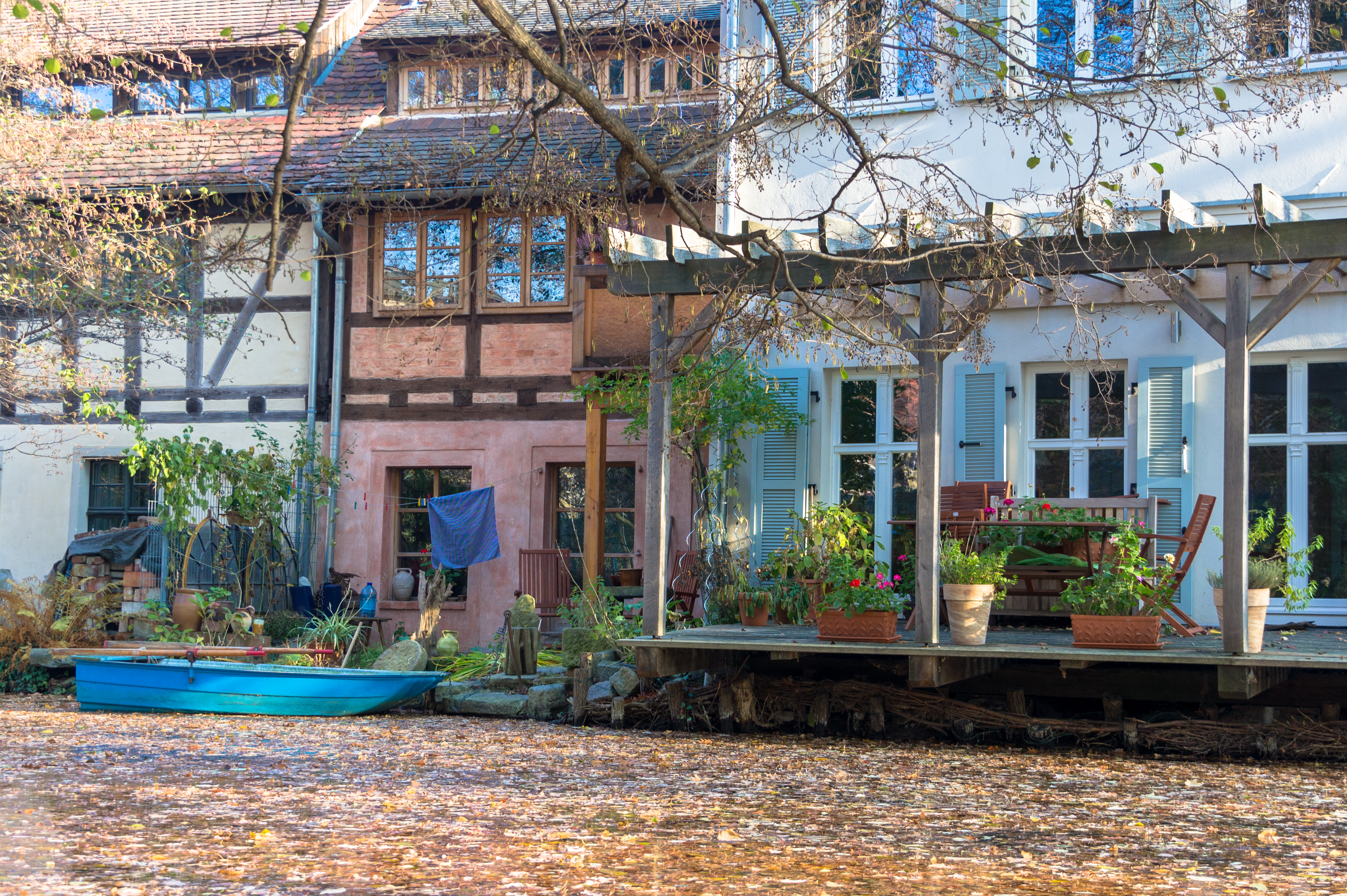
Spree in Cottbus
