= Arbeitsgruppe Alternative Wirtschaftspolitik =

German think tank

In the Working Group Alternative Economic Policy (also known as the Memorandum or Memo Group for short), economists and trade unionists work on the development of economic policy proposals and perspectives that are geared towards securing meaningful jobs, improving living standards and expanding the social security system for workers, as well as effectively protecting the environment in the Federal Republic of Germany.

In doing so, it criticises positions and theories that subordinate employment, income, social benefits and environmental protection to private sector profits. The vast majority of economists support economic policies that are primarily geared towards private profit and economic growth, and they give the impression that there is no alternative for scientific reasons. The working group counters this with its economic and socio-political analyses and proposals, with a focus on labour and social justice, and publishes these every year in the week before 1 May as a book, which is presented at the same time in an online press conference.

The working group hosts a yearly summer school in cooperation with ver.di.

== Development ==
The working group was founded in 1975 by three professors at the University of Bremen, Jörg Huffschmid, Rudolf Hickel and Herbert Schui. They presented their first memorandum for an effective and social economic policy in November 1975.

Since 1977, a memorandum for an alternative economic policy has been published every year. In addition, numerous statements on current economic, financial and social policy issues have been prepared. The memorandum was conceived as a ‘counter-report’ to the annual report of the German Council of Economic Experts (the ‘five wise men’) in order to provide a platform for an alternative doctrine to the prevailing economic science.

In 1995, the European memorandum group European Economists for an Alternative Economic Policy in Europe (also known as the EuroMemo Group) was launched on the initiative of Jörg Huffschmid, which also presents an English-language memorandum every year. It contains alternative economic analyses and recommendations for the economic policy of the European Union and its member states.

The Working Group on Alternative Economic Policy celebrated its 30 year anniversary in 2005.

In 2011, the Working Group on Alternative Economic Policy, the EuroMemorandum Group, the Academic Advisory Board of Attac Germany and the Rosa Luxemburg Foundation established the Jörg Huffschmid Prize in memory of founding member Jörg Huffschmid, who died in 2009. The prize is awarded every two years for final theses or dissertations in the field of political economy at European institution of higher education.

In 2012, the Working Group on Alternative Economic Policy joined the Umfairteilen alliance.

The working group had operated without a formal structure since its foundation. It was only on 1 January 2017 that it founded a non-profit registered association.

On 17 April 2020, the working group announced via a press release that it would hold its annual press conference to present the publication of the Memorandum 2020 on 24 April 2020 for the first time as a publicly online press conference.

== Well-known members and employees ==
- Christoph Butterwegge
- Rudolf Hickel
- Jörg Hufschmid
- Axel Troost

== Awards ==
- 1987 Democracy Prize of the Blätter für deutsche und internationale Politik (German and International Politics Journal)
- 2010 Golden Award of Change

== Publications ==
=== Memorandum East Germany ===
From 1991 to 2009, the working group published an annual memorandum on the economic situation in East Germany.
