= Axel Troost =

German politician (1954–2023)

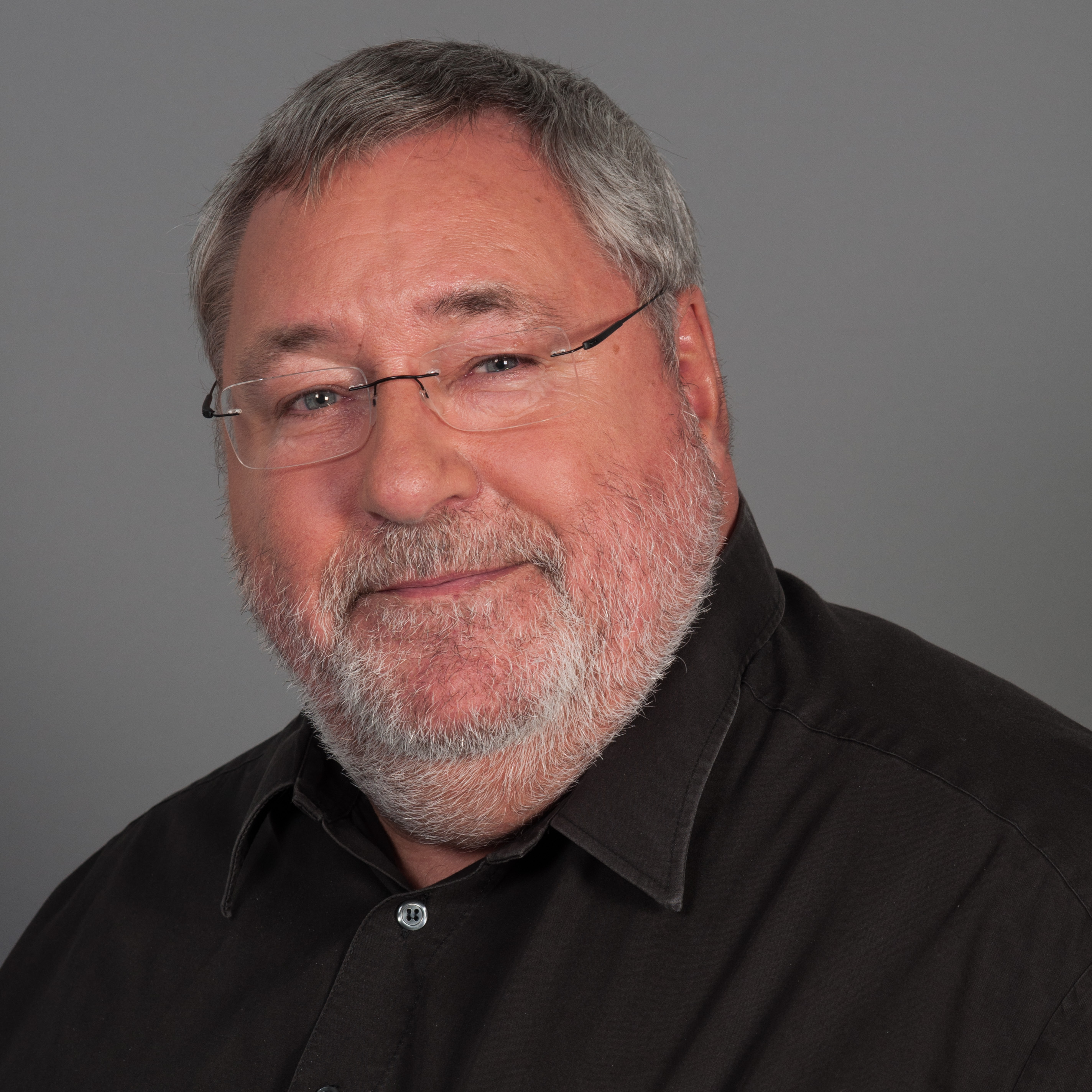
- Troost in 2014

Member of Bundestag
- In office 2005–2017

Personal details
- Born: 1 September 1954
- Died: 6 January 2023 (aged 68)
- Party: The Left
- Occupation: Politician; Economist

Axel Troost (1 September 1954 – 6 January 2023) was a German economist and politician. He was a member of the Bundestag from 2005 to 2017 and a brief period in 2021.

From 2012, he was one of the four Vice Chairmen of his party (Die Linke).

== Life ==
=== Education and career ===
Born in Hagen, Troost obtained Abitur at Schule Schloss Salem in 1973, and studied economics at Philipps-Universität Marburg, where he obtained a doctorate (Dr. rer. pol.) in 1982 with a thesis on the subject of national debt and credit institutes – public borrowing in the context of the overall lending and service operations of commercial banks. Troost was head of the Working Group on Alternative Economic Policy (Arbeitsgruppe Alternative Wirtschaftspolitik) since 1981 and managing director of the Progress Institute for Economic Research (PIW GmbH) in Bremen and Teltow since 1984. He also worked as managing director of the Office for Structural Research Rostock (BÜSTRO) in Rostock from 1990 to 2001.

=== Political career ===
Troost was a member of the Social Democratic Party of Germany (SPD) from 1970 to 1973 and a member of the German Communist Party (DKP) from 1976 to 1984. He later co-founded the Electoral Alternative for Labour and Social Justice (WASG) and served as a member of its federal executive committee from 2005 to 2007. Troost was a member of the federal executive committee of the Left Party since the Left Party.PDS merged with the WASG. He was deputy chairman of the Left Party since 3 June 2012.

=== Parliamentary activities ===
Troost was a Member of the German Bundestag since 2005. He served as spokesman on financial policy for the Left Party parliamentary group. During the 16th electoral term, he was a substitute member of the Second Joint Bundestag-Bundesrat Commission on Modernising the Federal System and a member of the Hypo Real Estate (HRE) committee of inquiry, which shed light on the company's operations during the 2008 financial crisis. In the 17th electoral term, Troost was one of the Parliamentary Secretaries and a member of the Finance Committee and the Subcommittee on Local Government Affairs. Troost stood as a candidate for direct election representing the Leipzig-Land constituency and was re-elected to the Bundestag via the party list of Saxony (on fourth position) in 2013. He continued to serve as spokesman on financial policy during the 18th electoral term, and assumed the role of spokesman for the Bundestag group of Left Party parliamentarians from Saxony. Troost was also a member of the administrative council of the Federal Financial Supervisory Authority (BaFin).

=== Other activities ===
Troost was a member of the executive committee of the Institute of Modern Solidarity (ISM) since 2010 and one of its five spokespersons since 2014. He was a long-standing member of Attac and the German Federation of Democratic Scientists (BdWi). After years of membership in the IG Metall trade union, Troost joined the United Services Union (Ver.di) in 2009.

=== Personal life and death ===
Axel Troost was married and had two children. He died on 6 January 2023, at the age of 68.

== Publications (in English) ==
Axel Troost, Lisa Paus: A European Clearing Union – The Monetary Union 2.0, March 2011

Axel Troost, Philipp Hersel: How a Socialization of the German Banking System might look, 2012, Rosa Luxemburg Stiftung, New York

Klaus Busch, Axel Troost, Gesine Schwan, Frank Bsirske, Joachim Bischoff, Mechthild Schrooten, Harald Wolf: A Europe built on solidarity is possible. Pamphlet for another European Union, November 2016
