= Ingo Stützle =

German political scientist

Ingo Stützle (born 1976) is a German political scientist.

== Life ==
Stützle studied political science at the Free University of Berlin and completed his doctorate at the Philipps University of Marburg in 2012 with a thesis entitled Der ausgeglichene Staatshaushalt als Paradigma und politisches Projekt. Based on this, he published the book Austerität als politisches Projekt. Von der monetären Integration Europas zur Eurokrise (Austerity as a Political Project. From the Monetary Integration of Europe to the Euro Crisis) in 2013. He received the Jörg Huffschmid Prize for his work in 2013.

Stützle's research focuses on Marxist monetary theory and European integration research. He also researches and writes on the subject of the Critique of political economy. In 2008, he was awarded the David Riazanov Prize for the "best young researcher in the field of Marx-Engels research and edition". Stützle was managing editor of PROKLA. Zeitschrift für kritische Sozialwissenschaften from October 2014 until May 2022. Since 2019, he has been in charge of the Marx-Engels-Werkausgabe (MEW; Max Engels Collected Works) at Karl Dietz Verlag Berlin.

Stützle was a member of the editorial board of the monthly newspaper ak - analyse & kritik, where he published book reviews and articles.

== Publications (selected) ==
=== German ===
- together with Jan Hoff, Alexis Petrioli, Frieder Otto Wolf (editors): Das Kapital neu lesen. Beiträge zur radikalen Philosophie. Münster 2006, ISBN 3-89691-605-X.
- Austerität als politisches Projekt. Von der monetären Integration Europas zur Eurokrise. Westfälisches Dampfboot, 2. corrected edition Münster 2014 (first edition in 2013), ISBN 978-3-89691-938-0.
- together with Rolf Hecker (editors): Karl Marx: Das Kapital 1.5. Die Wertform, Berlin 2017, ISBN 978-3-320-02334-8.
- together with Rolf Hecker (editors): Karl Marx: Marx Engels Werke Band 44, Berlin 2018, ISBN 978-3-320-02336-2.
- Autor_innenkollektiv: Mythen über Marx. Die populärsten Kritiken, Fehlurteile und Missverständnisse, Berlin 2018, ISBN 978-3-86505-748-8.
- togeth with Martin Beck (Hrsg.): Die neuen Bonapartisten: mit Marx den Aufstieg von Trump & Co. verstehen. Dietz Verlag, Berlin 2018, ISBN 978-3-320-02348-5 (free download of the PDF on dietzberlin.de).
- editor: Work-Work-Balance. Marx, die Poren des Arbeitstags und neue Offensiven des Kapitals. Dietz Verlag, Berlin 2020, ISBN 978-3-320-02366-9.
- together with Rolf Hecker (Hg.): Engels’ »Anti-Dühring«. Kontext, Interpretationen, Wirkung (Begleitband zur Neuen Studienausgabe). Dietz Verlag. Berlin 2020, ISBN 978-3-320-02370-6.

=== English ===
- together with Lars Bretthauer, Alexander Gallas, John Kannankulam (editors): Reading Poulantzas. Merlin Press, London 2011, ISBN 978-0-85036-647-1.
- together with Stephan Kaufmann: Is the whole World going bankrupt?, Berlin 2012 (available at rosalux.de, December 2012).
- together with Valeria Bruschi, Antonella Muzzupappa, Sabine Nuss, Anne Steckner: PolyluxMarx. A Capital Workbook in Slides Volume One, Berlin 2013, (vol1.polyluxmarx.de)
- together with Stephan Kaufmann: Thomas Piketty’s Capital in the Twenty-First Century. An Introduction. Verso. London 2017, ISBN 978-1-78478-614-4.
- How Unscientific is the Labor Theory of Value?, October 1, 2020, viewpointmag.com.
