= Jörg Huffschmid =

German economist

- Born: 19 February 1940
- Died: 5 December 2009 (aged 69)

Academic background
- Education: Free University of Berlin
- Influences: Karl Marx; John Maynard Keynes; James Tobin

Academic work
- Discipline: Political economy Economic policy
- School or tradition: Marxian economics
- Institutions: University of Bremen

Jörg Huffschmid (19 February 1940 – 5 December 2009) was a German economist. He held a chair at the University of Bremen.

== Biography ==
Huffschmid was born in Cologne. He studied philosophy and economics in Freiburg im Breisgau, Paris and at the Free University of Berlin. In 1967, Huffschmid received his doctorate in economics and social sciences (Dr. rer. Pol.). He then worked as an assistant at the Free University of Berlin, at an institute headed by Helmut Arndt.

In 1973, Huffschmid was appointed professor of political economy and economic policy at the University of Bremen. Huffschmid taught at the university and led the Institut für Europäische Wirtschaft, Wirtschafts- und Gesellschaftspolitik until 2005, when he became professor emeritus.

In 1975 Huffschmid founded the Working Group Alternative Economic Policy, also known as the Memorandum Group, with Rudolf Hickel and Herbert Schui. In the 1980s, he was a member of the Scientific Advisory Board of the DKP-affiliated Institute for Marxist Studies and Research (IMSF). From 1984 until 1989 he was a member of the DKP executive committee.

In 1995, he was a founding member of the European Economists for an Alternative Economic Policy in Europe working group.

Huffschmid's research focused on European integration, financial markets, corporate concentration, the economics of armament and disarmament, including conversion. One of his fundamental criticisms was that money capital is increasingly decoupled from the real economy, while the pressure to generate returns is increasing in the latter.

== Impact ==
His first book, Die Politik des Kapitals was quite important for the student movement of the late 1960s in Germany.

In 2000, Huffschmid was a member of the Enquête Commission of the German Bundestag on "Globalisation of the World Economy – Challenges and Responses". He was co-editor of the political science monthly magazines Blätter für deutsche und internationale Politik, and sat on the advisory board for the Bremen Foundation for Arms Conversion, the Z. Zeitschrift Marxistische Erneuerung (Marxist Renewal Journal) and the globalisation-critical network Attac.

The Jörg Huffschmid Prize was awarded for the first time in 2011. The prize was established in memory of Jörg Huffschmid's academic work and socio-political commitment by the Alternative Economic Policy Working Group, Attac and its Scientific Advisory Board, the EuroMemo Group and the Rosa Luxemburg Foundation.
