= Schwielochsee (lake) =

Lake in Brandenburg, Germany

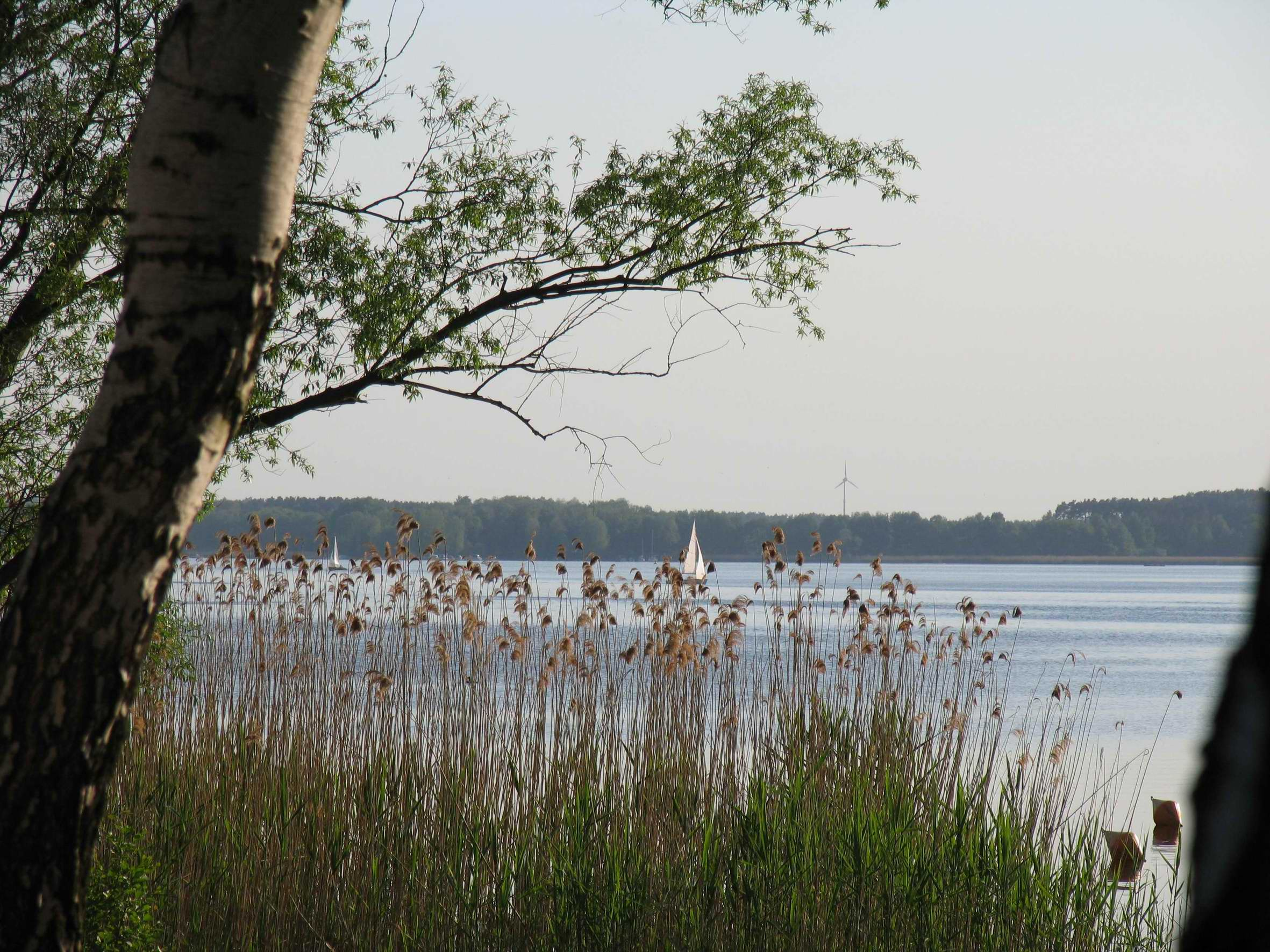

- Location within Brandenburg
- Location: Brandenburg
- Coordinates: 52°04′N 14°12′E
- Primary inflows: Spree
- Primary outflows: Spree
- Basin countries: Germany
- Surface area: 13.3 km^{2} (5.1 sq mi)
- Average depth: 2.8 m (9 ft 2 in)
- Max. depth: 14 m (46 ft)
- Surface elevation: 29.5 m (97 ft)
- Settlements: Schwielochsee

The Schwielochsee (German pronunciation: [ʃviːlɔxˌzeː]) is a lake in Lower Lusatia, the south-eastern part of Brandenburg, eastern Germany. Its area is 13.3 km^{2} (5.1 sq mi), so it is the largest lake in this area. It is fed and drained by the river Spree. The Spree flows in from the west and leaves the lake to the north in the direction of Beeskow. Part of the lake lies within the territory of the municipality Schwielochsee, which was named after the lake.

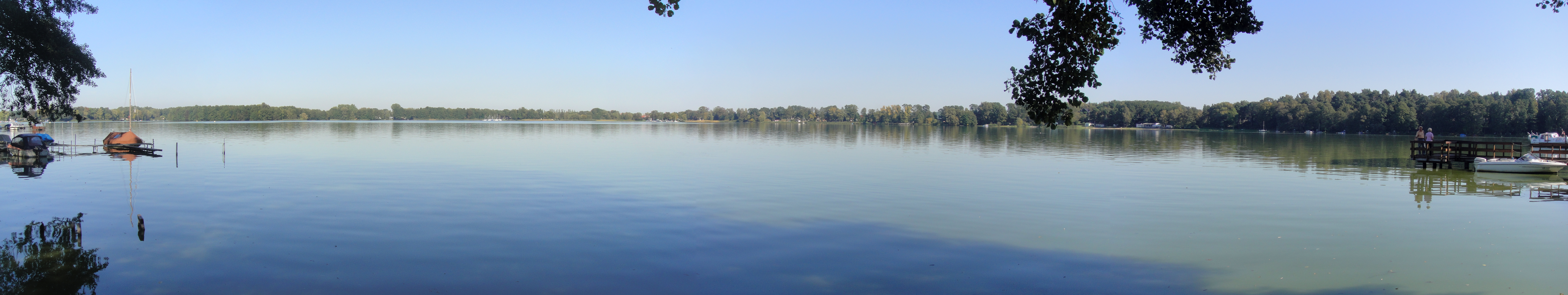
The Schwielochsee seen from Goyatz

== Location ==
The Schwielochsee is divided into the Großer Schwielochsee and the Kleiner Schwielochsee. The latter is located further south, near the villages of Jessern and Goyatz. It has a depth of eight to nine metres and is connected to the Great Schwielochsee by a channel called "Hals". The depth of the Großer Schwielochsee is about 14 metres. The water inflow comes from the Ressener Mühlenfließ in the west, from the Doberburger and Möllener Mühlenfließ in the east and from some former peat ditches. The water level is mainly regulated by the Spree River, which flows through the north-western part of the lake.

== Geology ==
The formation of Lake Schwieloch, as with all natural lakes in the area, can be traced back to the ice-age formations that brought debris and boulders with them. Even today, numerous erratic blocks of various sizes and rock types bear witness to their Scandinavian origin. The meltwater released during the later thawing of the ice initially dammed up in the already existing gullies. Due to this fact and despite the difficulty of determining its exact origin, the Schwielochsee can be described as a gully lake, which is also evidenced by its elongated and narrow shape.
