= Harry Nick =

East German Marxist economist (1932–2014)

- Born: 15 August 1932; Borowo ( Łódź Voivodeship), Poland
- Died: 7 December 2014 (aged 82); Berlin, Germany
- Education: College for Economic Planning ("Hochschule für Planökonomie")
- Occupations: Marxist Economist; Professor; Commentator-pundit
- Employer: Academy for Social Sciences ("Akademie für Gesellschaftswissenschaften beim ZK der SED")
- Political party: SED
- Spouse: y
- Children: 6

Harry Nick (15 August 1932 – 7 December 2014) was an East German Marxist economist.

He was a 57-year-old professor and department head at the Central Committee Academy for Social Sciences ("Akademie für Gesellschaftswissenschaften beim ZK der SED") in Berlin when street protesters broke through the Berlin Wall in November 1989, after which many of his contemporaries rapidly disappeared into obscurity. Harry Nick emerged as a robust exponent of "economic literacy". He had always been prepared to argue his case, even when his evaluations were out of harmony with some party dogma of the moment: he spent the final decades of his life as a controversialist and media pundit, happy to explain what went wrong with the "socialist experiment" that was East Germany, but trenchant in his advocacy of core economic principals such as the central importance of shared "public" ownership of the means of production.

== Life ==
=== Provenance and early years ===
Harry Nick was born in Borowo, a short distance outside Łódź. The region had reverted to Polish control after 1918 but remained multi-ethnic throughout the 1930s. Nevertheless, even as a small child Harry Nick was, during 1939, intensely aware of the seemingly sudden erupting tensions between ethnic German speakers and ethnic Polish speakers. Harry Nick was from the ethnic German community, and would never forget the time when two friends from the Polish side of the growing ethnic divide told him, "You are a Schwob. Also, our parents have forbidden us from playing with you." (Note: Many of Harry Nick's ancestors, both on his father's side and on his mother's side, had indeed emigrated from Swabia during the seventeenth century, which explains the use of the slang word "Schwob" in this context, though it is far from clear how the little Polish ex-friends knew of his ancestral provenance more than two centuries later.) His father was a forestry worker. In January/February 1945 the family were driven west by the ethnic cleansing of the time, settling in Sylda, a village in the rural Mansfelder mountain region south of Magdeburg. Nick completed his schooling in 1951 at the senior school (Oberschule) in nearby Hettstedt. During this time he was also a member of the local leadership team of the party-backed Free German Youth. On leaving school he worked for four months at the steel mill in Hettstedt as a "rod puller".

=== Student years ===
Between 1951 and 1954 he studied Industrial Economics and Organisation at the College for Economic Planning ("Hochschule für Planökonomie" - as it was known at that time) in Berlin-Karlshorst. He combined his studies with work as a research assistant on Marxism–Leninism. The topic for his degree dissertation was "The Nature of the Socio-economic changes in Czechoslovakia after the Second World War". After receiving his degree he stayed on at the college as an assistant at the college Institute for Political Economy, in the section devoted to the Political Economy of socialism, progressing to the position of a senior assistant over the next few years. He received his doctorate in 1959 for work on the accumulation of investment capital for livestock accommodation in large agricultural co-operatives. By 1962, he was also delivering lectures.

=== Post-graduate progression ===
It was in 1962 that Harry Nick moved on to the Central Committee Academy for Social Sciences ("Akademie für Gesellschaftswissenschaften beim ZK der SED"), initially as a researcher and, from 1964, also as a lecturer at the academy's Institute for Social Sciences. In 1965 he confirmed that his career lay in the academic sector by obtaining his Habilitation (higher degree) in return for a piece of work entitled "Der Fondsvorschuss als besondere Aufwandsart", which concerned alternative investment modalities. In 1967 he accepted a full professorship in Political Economy.

=== Professor ===
Nick remained in charge of research in respect of "Economic and Social Problems resulting from Academic and Technical Advances" at the Institute for Political Economy till 1990. Principal areas of work included the Economics of Funding new enterprises and Economic Accounting. It may have been out of respect for his unwavering commitment to basic socialist principals that between 1967 and 1990 Harry Nick was able to publish a succession of articles drawing attention to problems afflicting East Germany which, in his judgement, called for urgent economic reforms and remedies. Among his more important published contributions were "Technical Revolution and the Economics of Funding Manufacturing" (1967) (Note: "Technische Revolution und Ökonomie der Produktionsfonds",) "Society and Business under Socialism" (1970), (Note: "Gesellschaft und Betrieb im Sozialismus") and "The Economic and Social Impact of Academic and Technical Progress" (1986). (Note: "Ökonomische und soziale Wirksamkeit des wissenschaftlich-technischen Fortschritts")

During the early 1960s party leaders were increasingly desperate to slow down or even reverse the widening gap in economic performance and general prosperity between socialist East Germany and capitalist West Germany. One response was to try and restrict economic emigration from east to west. Another involved economic reforms at home which would focus more on profitability and decentralising decision making. The so-called New Economic System was formally launched in 1963. Western sources tend to see it as a belated acceptance of western-style economic liberal economics. The way in which it was implemented (or was not) during the 1960s and 1970s suggest it was no such thing. Walter Ulbricht seems always to have been, at most, a deeply reluctant convert to inconvenient economic truths. Harry Nick engaged with commitment in the debates surrounding the New Economic System, and what it should mean in terms of economic planning and management of the national economy. He saw and articulated an acute need for "economic reform in the context of genuine socialism". To the extent that his vision was never realised, he continued to articulate it, appropriately updated, long after the increasingly obvious bankruptcy of the East German economy had effectively put an end to the East German dictator-state during 1989–90.

=== Changes and reunification ===
The Central Committee Academy for Social Sciences closed in 1990 at around the same time as the one-party dictatorship collapsed. For Harry Nick, still aged only 58, this triggered both enforced retirement and the start of a new career. He remained engaged both politically and as a journalist.

In 1989 not everyone anticipated reunification with the same bull-headed clarity as Chancellor Kohl, but there was a widespread acceptance within the political class that as the winds of Glasnost blew across from, of all places, Moscow, the SED's days as the country's perpetually ruling party were numbered. During the first party of 1990 the old East German ruling party embarked on a lengthy restructuring programme in order to prepare itself for a democratic future. One of the first visible changes involved a new name for the party. Harry Nick joined a series of working groups set up within the new Party of Democratic Socialism (PDS), producing reports for the party executive on economic policy. He became a member of the "Economy and Democracy" forum and for many years participated in the party's Marxist Forum. Post-unification Nick was, in addition, a respected member of the Leibnitz Society.

Between 1997 and 2012 Harry Nick contributed regularly to Neues Deutschland on various economics topics. In his final article he wrote that developments in [what had previously been] East Germany since 1990 could "not be understood without also understanding that the defining maxim of the market economy is the same as that of a common robber - grab as much as you can". (Note: "... nicht zu verstehen, wenn man nicht begreift, dass die Maxime der Marktwirtschaft dieselbe ist wie die eines gewöhnlichen Räubers - so viel zu raffen wie nur möglich")

=== Looking back ===
But it should not be assumed that he ever became uncritical of government economic management between 1949 and 1989. Although it was common at the time and subsequently to describe the East German economy as a "planned economy", reality was frequently a grotesque absence of planning. Economic policy certainly operated according to a powerfully dirigiste midel, but attempts at micro-management and other interventions by politicians were frequently mutually contradictory and generally based on short-term often personal considerations. Nick lived through the timid economic reforms of the early 1960s and their abrupt abandonment by the leadership. What made the matter worse, he later recalled, was that as the crisis for "real socialism" became ever clearer, there was no political response. By 1989 the German Democratic Republic really had reached the end of the road, in terms of its growing technological deficit and the widening shortfall between supply and demand. In 2012 Nick spelled out his verdict that the "socialist attempt [had] not passed its historical acid test".

A recurring theme of Harry Nick's later work is the economic and political "failure of Eastern European socialism". If ever the attempt to create a true socialist state were to be attempted [in Germany] again, the "democratic process [must be sustained] even while the rule of the bourgeoisie is overcome". (Note: "...der demokratische Prozess auch bei der Überwindung der Herrschaft der Bourgeoisie" weitergehen soll.)

== Personal ==
Nick was married with, by December 1967 six children, of whom four were boys.

He died on 7 December 2014 in Berlin.

== Honours and awards (selection) ==
- 1969: Patriotic Order of Merit in Bronze
- 1976: Banner of Labor Class II
- 1979: National Prize of the German Democratic Republic
- Hermann Duncker Medal
- Honoured as a Meritorious University Teacher of the German Democratic Republic

Compared to some of his colleagues who were more overtly industrious and / or more willing to follow official interpretations of party dogma unquestioningly, Nick himself found this a relatively modest haul by the standards of the time and place. (Note: "Ich erhielt die kleineren Ausgaben fast aller großen Orden der DDR, den Vaterländischen Verdienstorden (in Bronze), den Nationalpreis der DDR (III. Klasse im Kollektiv), den Orden Banner der Arbeit (Stufe II). Mir wurde der Ehrentitel "Verdienter Hochschullehrer der DDR" verliehen. Aber Reisekader war ich nicht; meine erste Reise ins westliche Ausland ging im April 1989 nach Österreich.") He did not enjoy travel privileges, and made his first foreign trip - to Austria - only in 1989. Even then the necessary permissions were received only as a result of what Harry Nick himself described in a semi-autobographical book published in 2003, as "some kind of a tacit oversight" ("... eine Art stillschweigendes Versehen").

== Output (selection) ==
- Technische Revolution und Ökonomie der Produktionsfonds. Dietz, Berlin 1967.
- Gesellschaft und Betrieb im Sozialismus. Die Wirtschaft, Berlin 1970.
- Ökonomische und soziale Wirksamkeit des wissenschaftlich-technischen Fortschritts. (As head of the author-collective) Akademie für Gesellschaftswissenschaften beim ZK der SED, 1986.
- Die Marxsche Lehre im Lichte des sozialistischen Desasters sowie der globalen Revolution. GNN, Schkeuditz 1997.
- Veränderungen in der Arbeitswelt. (= Pankower Vorträge 45), Helle Panke, Berlin 2002.
- Gemeinwesen DDR. Erinnerungen und Überlegungen eines Politökonomen.VSA, Hamburg 2003, ISBN 3-89965-013-1.
