= Schwielochsee =

Schwielochsee Gójacki Jazor
- Municipality
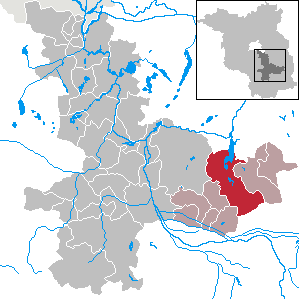
- Location of Schwielochsee within Dahme-Spreewald district
- Interactive map of Schwielochsee
- Location within Germany Location within Brandenburg
- Coordinates: 51°59′08″N 14°13′09″E
- Country: Germany
- State: Brandenburg
- District: Dahme-Spreewald
- Municipal assoc.: Lieberose/Oberspreewald

Government
  - Mayor (2024–29): Rainer Hilgenfeld

Area
  - Total: 131.4 km^{2} (50.7 sq mi)
- Elevation: 41–103 m (135–338 ft)

Population (2025-12-31)
  - Total: 1,462
  - Density: 11.13/km^{2} (28.82/sq mi)
- Time zone: UTC+01:00 (CET)
  - Summer (DST): UTC+02:00 (CEST)
- Postal codes: 15848, 15913
- Dialling codes: 033676, 033671, 035478, 035751
- Vehicle registration: LDS
- Website: Gemeinde Schwielochsee

Schwielochsee (German pronunciation: [ʃviːlɔxˌzeː]) or Gójacki Jazor (in Lower Sorbian) is a municipality in the district of Dahme-Spreewald in Brandenburg in Germany formed of 10 small villages. It is located at the southern shores of the lake Schwielochsee.

On 26 October 2003, the municipality of Schwielochsee was formed by merging six municipalities. These were Goyatz-Guhlen, Jessern, Lamsfeld-Groß Liebitz, Mochow, Ressen-Zaue and Speichrow.

Parts of the municipality are in the Sorbian settlement area; in those areas, the German and Lower Sorbian languages have equal status.

== History ==
From 1815 to 1947, the constituent localities of Schwielochsee were part of the Prussian Province of Brandenburg, from 1947 to 1952 of the State of Brandenburg, from 1952 to 1990 partially of the Bezirk Cottbus (Goyatz-Guhlen, Jessern, Lamsfeld-Groß Liebitz, Mochow and Ressen-Zaue) and partially of the Bezirk Frankfurt (Speichrow) in East Germany. Since 1990, they have again been part of Brandenburg, since 2003 united as the municipality of Schwielochsee.

== Demography ==
Development of population since 1875 within the current boundaries (Blue line: Population; Dotted line: Comparison to population development of Brandenburg state; Grey background: Time of Nazi rule; Red background: Time of communist rule)

Schwielochsee: Population development
within the current boundaries (2017)

Year	Pop.	±% p.a.
1875	2,517	—
1890	2,327	−0.52%
1910	1,985	−0.79%
1925	1,950	−0.12%
1933	1,928	−0.14%
1939	1,929	+0.01%
1946	2,790	+5.41%
1950	2,538	−2.34%
1964	1,785	−2.48%
1971	1,698	−0.71%
1981	1,509	−1.17%
1985	1,491	−0.30%
1989	1,501	+0.17%
1990	1,500	−0.07%

Year	Pop.	±% p.a.
1991	1,506	+0.40%
1992	1,548	+2.79%
1993	1,523	−1.61%
1994	1,522	−0.07%
1995	1,549	+1.77%
1996	1,572	+1.48%
1997	1,588	+1.02%
1998	1,643	+3.46%
1999	1,700	+3.47%
2000	1,706	+0.35%
2001	1,741	+2.05%
2002	1,734	−0.40%
2003	1,699	−2.02%
2004	1,693	−0.35%

Year	Pop.	±% p.a.
2005	1,702	+0.53%
2006	1,668	−2.00%
2007	1,666	−0.12%
2008	1,633	−1.98%
2009	1,628	−0.31%
2010	1,613	−0.92%
2011	1,600	−0.81%
2012	1,561	−2.44%
2013	1,556	−0.32%
2014	1,523	−2.12%
2015	1,499	−1.58%
2016	1,490	−0.60%
2017	1,488	−0.13%
