= Sorbian Americans =

Americans of Sorb/Wend birth or descent

Serbscy Američenjo (Upper Sorbian) Serbske Amerikanarje (Lower Sorbian)

Total population
- 1,858

Regions with significant populations
- Texas, Smaller communities live in Wisconsin and Illinois.

Languages
- English, Sorbian (Upper Sorbian, Lower Sorbian), German

Religion
- Christianity

Related ethnic groups
- Other Sorbs; Czech Americans; Slovak Americans; Kashubian Americans; Polish Americans; Texan Silesians; German Americans

Sorbian Americans or Wendish Americans are Americans of Sorb/Wend descent. The largest community of Sorbs in the United States is in Texas, with a population of around 588 Sorbs/Wends.

== Notable people ==
- Arthur Fehr
- John Kilian
- Mato Kósyk
- Bogumił Šwjela
- John Symank

== See also ==
- Wends of Texas
- Giddings Deutsches Volksblatt
