= John Kilian =

Sorbian pastor, leader of the colony of Serbin, Texas

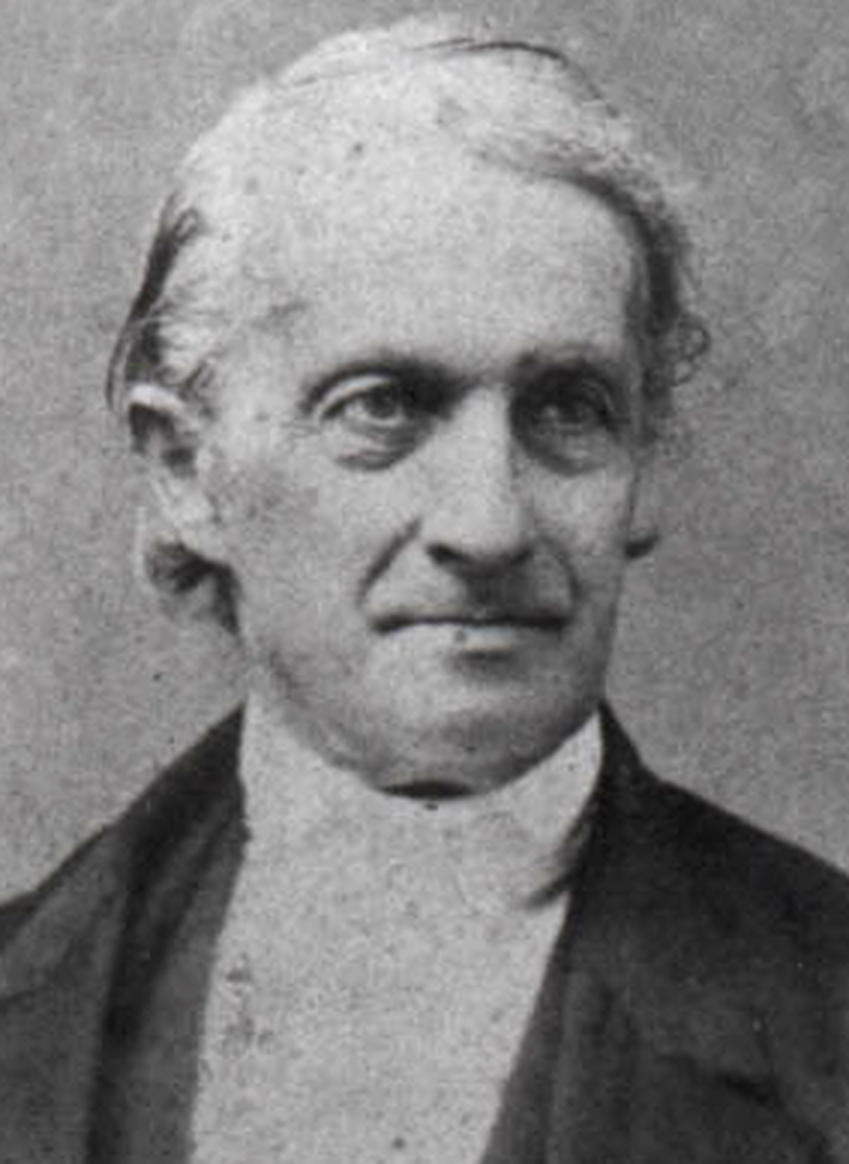
- Born: March 22, 1811; Doehlen, Kingdom of Saxony, Confederation of the Rhine
- Died: September 12, 1884 (aged 73); Serbin, Texas

John Kilian also German: Johann Kilian, Upper Sorbian: Jan Kilian, pronounced [ˈjaŋ ˈkʲilʲi.an] (March 22, 1811 – September 12, 1884) was a Lutheran pastor and leader of the colony known as the Wends of Texas.

== Background ==
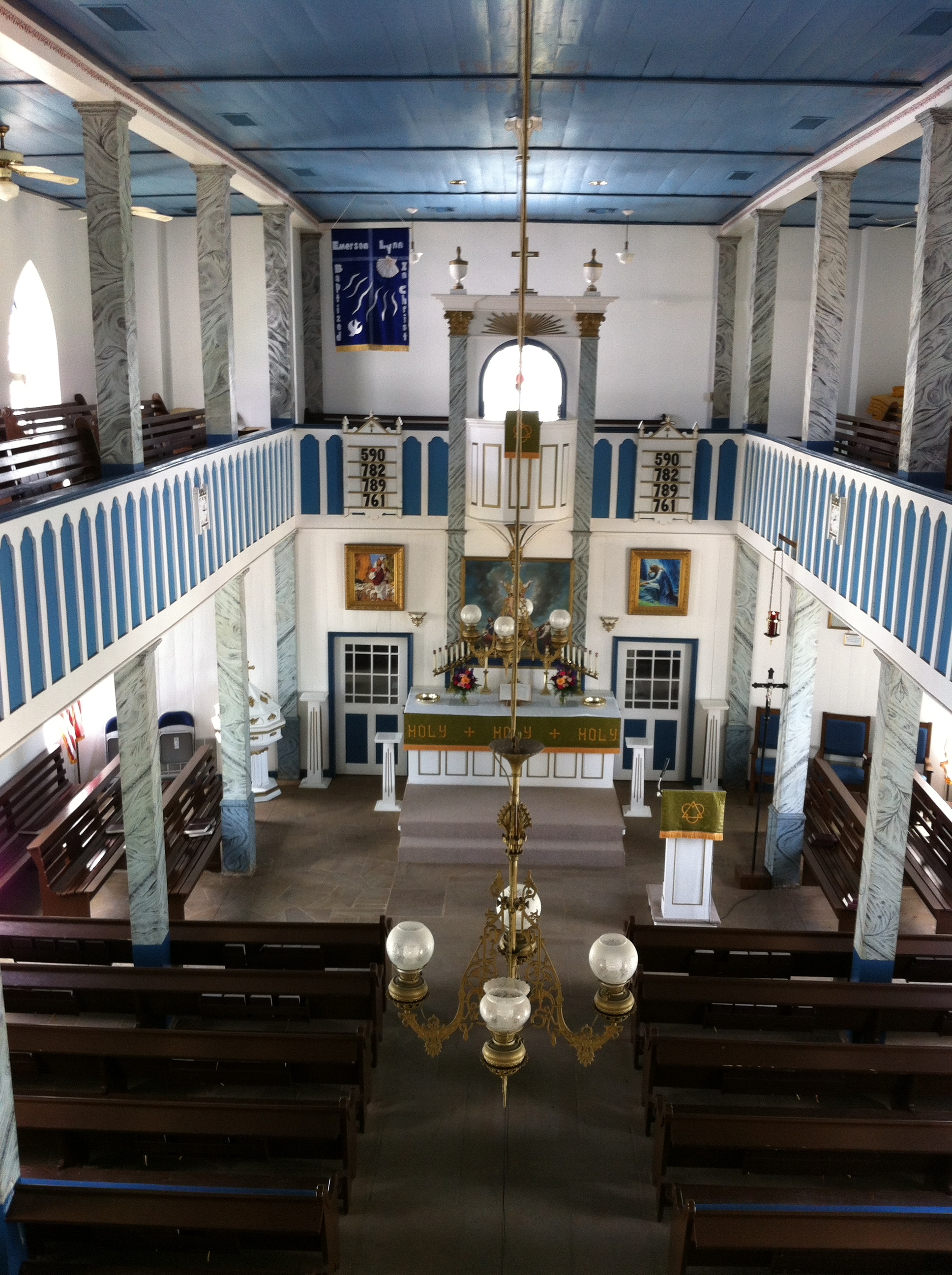
St. Paul's church, Serbin, built while he was the pastor, still in full use.

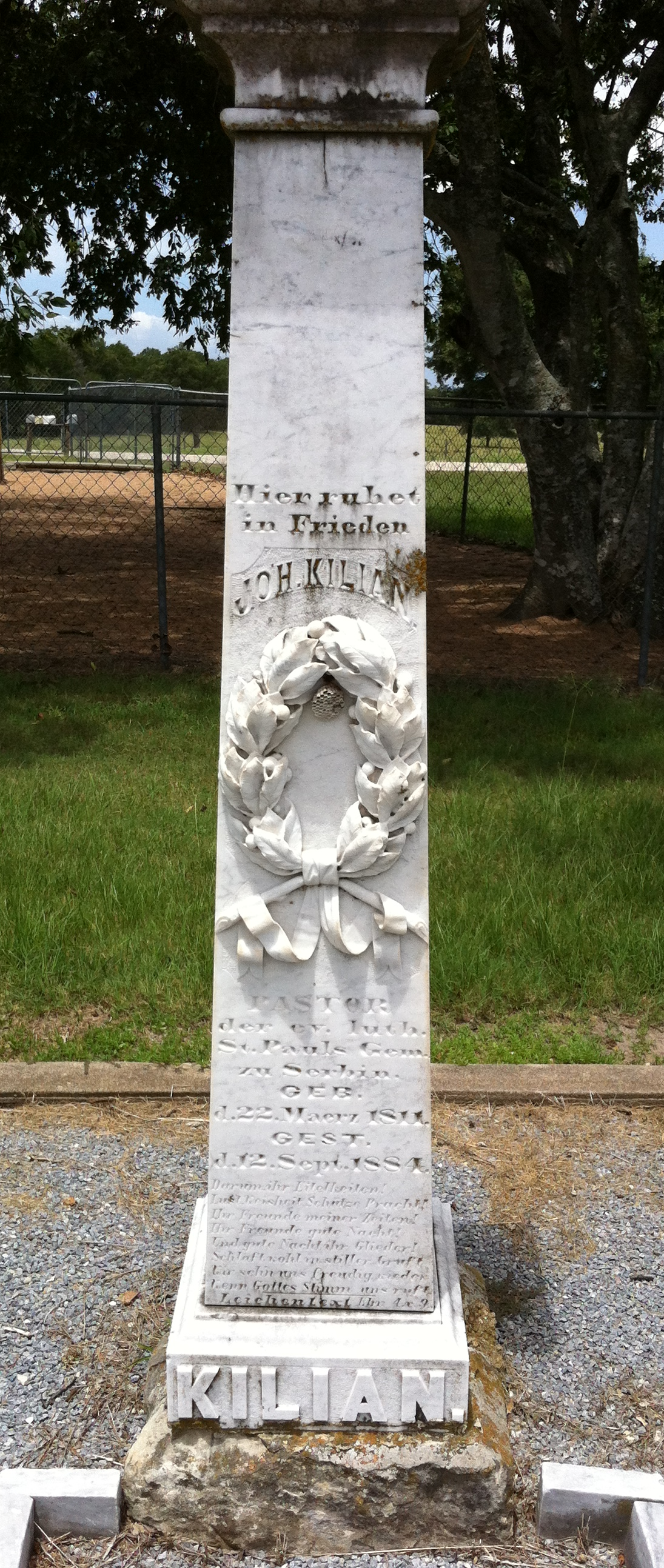
Kilian's gravestone in Serbin, in German.

John Kilian was born in Doehlen, in the Kingdom of Saxony. After school in Rachlau and Bautzen, he studied theology at the University of Leipzig. He was a pastor in Hochkirch (his home parish) from 1834 to 1837. Because of the death of his uncle he became a pastor in Kotitz. In 1848, he became a pastor in Weigersdorf, Prussia. He rejected "growing rationalism" among the clergy, calling for a return to Scripture as authoritative, translating a number of German items into Sorbian.

== Texas Colony ==
It was during the year 1854 that about 558 Wendish Lutherans from Kilian's congregations in Prussia and also from Saxony called him to lead them to Texas. Many people in Kilian's congregation were dissatisfied with the philosophy of rationalism spreading through Europe. Some viewed rationalism as an attempt to replace religion with science. With growing religious discontent, economic hardship and Kilian's desire to be a missionary in a foreign country, Kilian brought his followers to Galveston and eventually settled about 55 miles east of Austin in Lee County.

On March 25, 1854, a new Lutheran congregation was organized at Dauban, to become the cornerstone of a large Wendish emigration. Rev. Kilian was called as Pastor. This move resulted in the establishment of Low Pin Oak Settlement later renamed Serbin. One of the first acts accomplished by Rev. Kilian was to apply for membership in the fledgling Lutheran Church–Missouri Synod. St. Paul's Lutheran Church in Serbin became the first of many Missouri Synod churches in Texas, and it had the only Wendish language speaking school in America.

Kilian wrote a number of hymns that have survived. He also wrote poetry and poetic speeches that are preserved

== Concordia University Texas ==
The legacy of John Kilian is apparent at the campus of the Concordia University Texas which features Kilian Road and an over-150-year-old bell at the entrance of Building A which Kilian and his followers brought on their journey to Texas. At its old campus, the university's first building was named Kilian Hall.

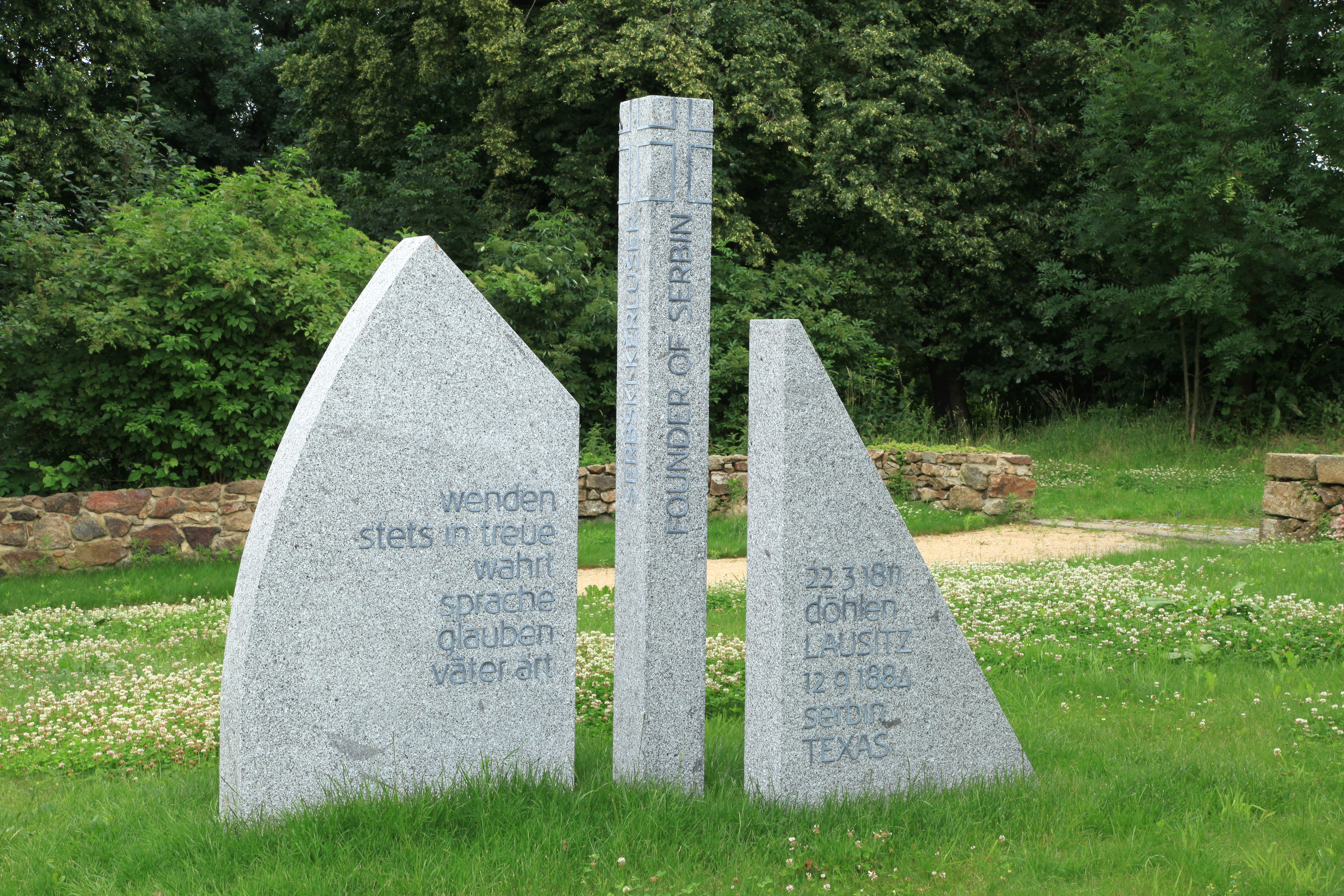
Monument to Kilian in Germany, calling to mind the ship carrying him and about 600 others to America

== Selected works ==
- Baptismal Records Of St. Paul Lutheran Church, Serbin, Texas 1854-1883

== Other sources ==
- Blasig, Anne. The Wends of Texas (The Naylor Company. San Antonio, Texas. 1957)
- Cravens, Craig and David Zersen, editors. Transcontinental Encounters: Central Europe Meets the American Heartland (Austin, TX: Concordia University Press, 2005)
- Grider, Sylvia. The Wendish Texans (The University of Texas Institute of Texan Cultures. San Antonio, Texas. 1982)
- Malinkowa, Trudla. Shores of Hope: Wends Go Overseas (Austin: Concordia University Press, 2009)
- Nielsen, George. In Search of Home, Nineteenth-Century Wendish Immigration (College Station: Texas A & M University Press.1989)
- Malinkowa, Trudla, ed. 2014. Jan Kilian (1811–1884). Pastor, Poet, Emigrant. Sammelband der internationalen Konferenz zum 200. Geburtstag des lutherischen Geistlichen, Bautzen, 23.–24. September 2011. Papers of the International Conference on the Occasion of the 200th Birthday of the Lutheran Minister, Bautzen, 23–24 September 2011. [each chapter in both German & English] Bautzen: Domowina Verlag.
- Wukasch, Charles. A Rock Against Alien Waves: A History of the Wends Second Edition (Austin: Concordia University Press, 2008)
- Zersen, David. An Exciting Find in a Wendish Vault in Texas. Concordia Historical Institute Quarterly. Fall 2012.
- Zersen, David, ed. The Poetry and Music of Jan Kilian (Austin: Concordia University Press, 2011)
- Zersen, David, "An Isolated Texas Lutheran Scholar Living in Hope." Concordia Historical Institute Quarterly. Summer 2018.
