= Czechoslovak Americans =

Czechoslovak Americans may refer to:

- Czech Americans
- Slovak Americans
