= Wends of Texas =

Ethnoreligious community in Texas, US

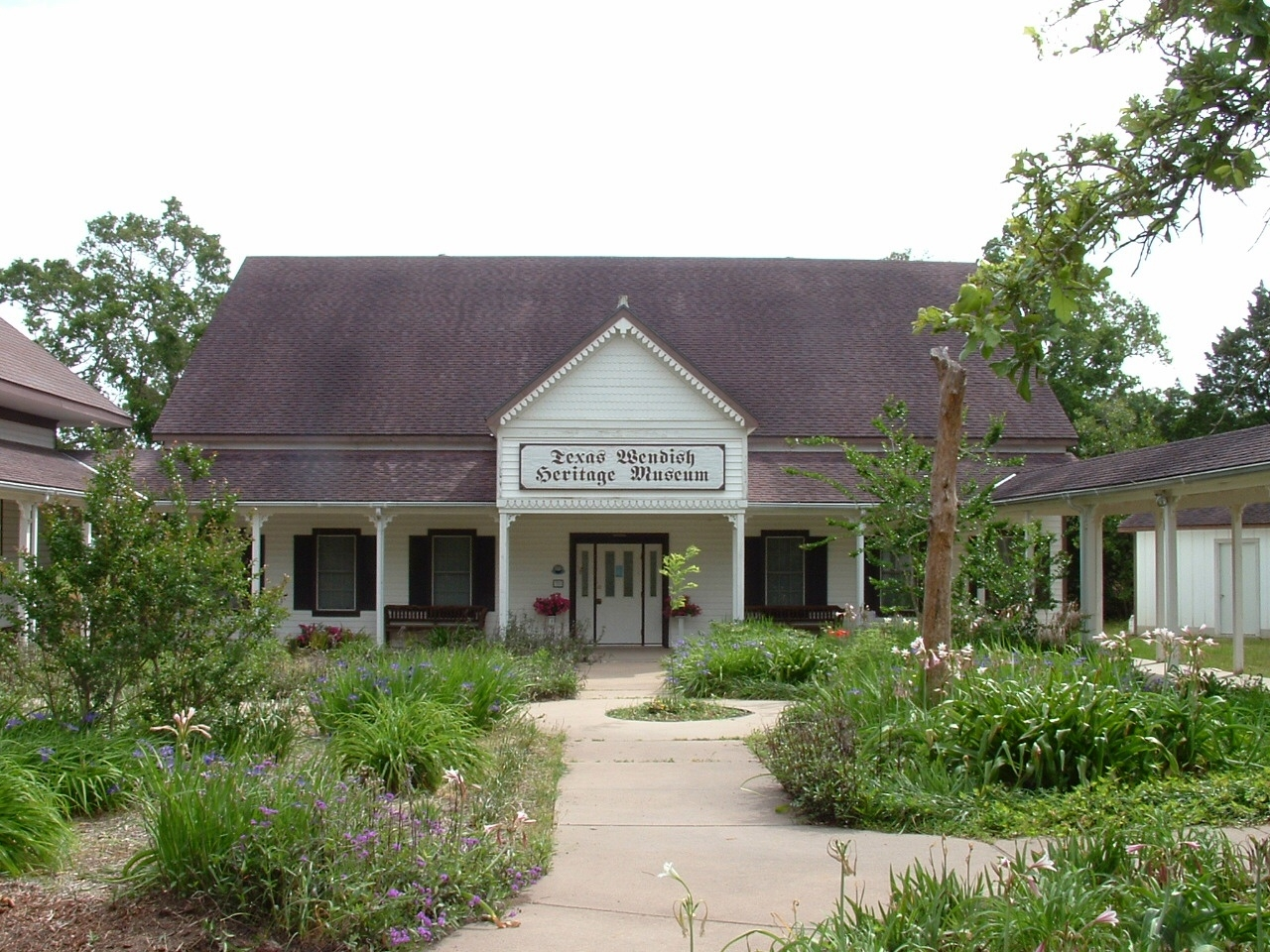
Texas Wendish Heritage Museum

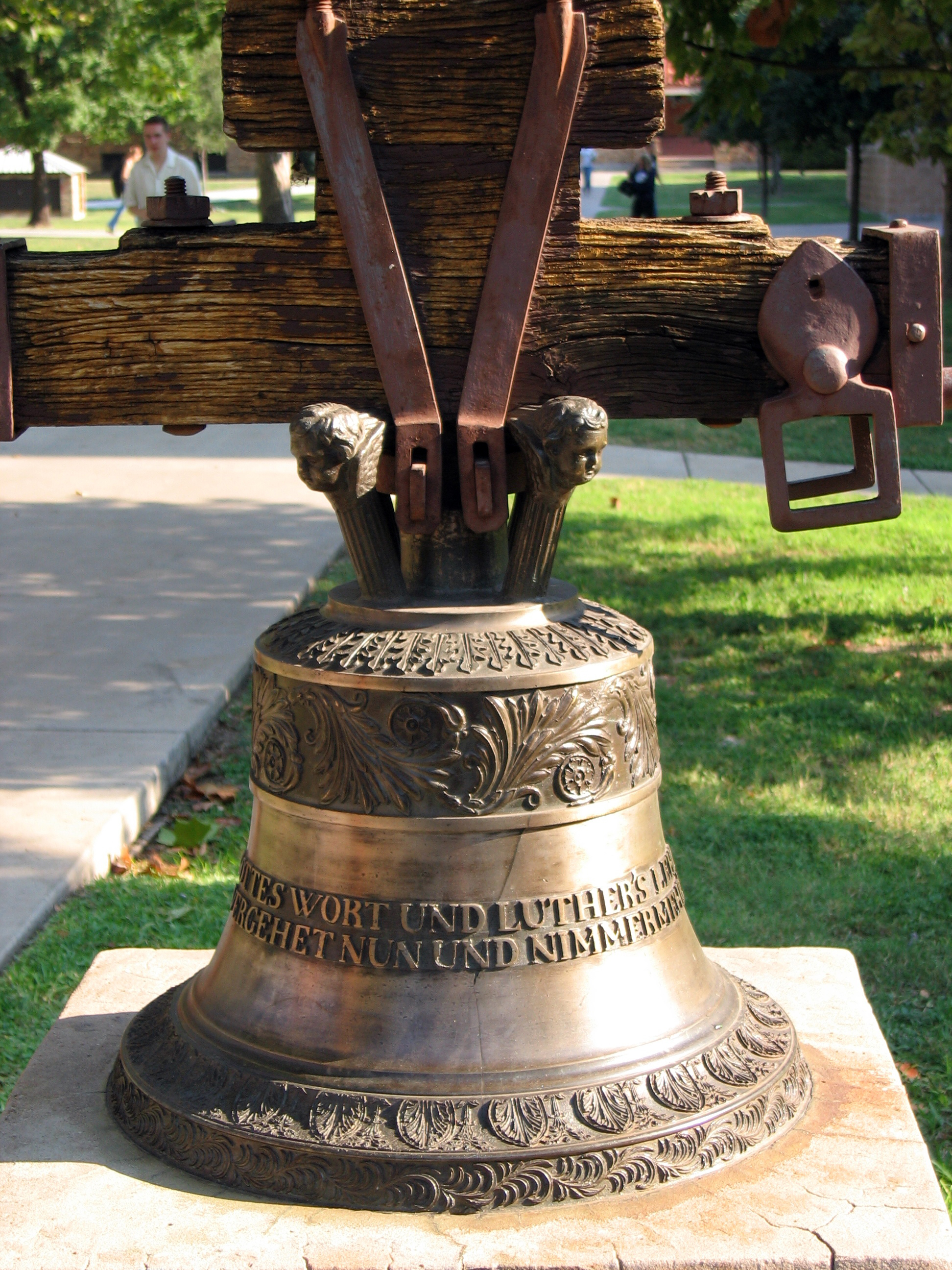
Texas Wendish Bell

The Texas Wends or Wends of Texas are a group of Americans descended from a congregation of 558 Sorbian/Wendish people under the leadership and pastoral care of John Kilian (Sorbian languages: Jan Kilian, German: Johann Killian) who emigrated from Lusatia (part of modern-day Germany) to Texas in 1854. The term also refers to the other emigrations (and all descendants) occurring before and after this group. However, none came close to the size or importance of the Wendish culture in Texas.

== History ==
=== Nineteenth century ===
==== Lusatia ====
In 1817, King Frederick William III of Prussia ordered the Lutheran and Reformed churches in his territory to unite, forming the Evangelical Church of the Prussian Union. The unification of the two branches of German Protestantism sparked a great deal of controversy. Many Lutherans, termed Old Lutherans, chose to leave the established churches and form independent church bodies. Many left for America and Australia. The dispute over ecumenism overshadowed other controversies within German Lutheranism. The group which eventually became the Wends of Texas was part of this movement, its members distinguished in their specific ethnic identity as Wends, i.e. a Slavic minority living within a predominantly German environment.

Resisting the merger of Lutheranism and Calvinism being forced by the national church, this group, comprising members of many congregations and villages, met at Dauban on March 23, 1854, to make decisions on what was to be done. It was decided to meet again in May to call a pastor. May 25, 1854, saw the call of John Kilian as pastor of the newly formed congregation and plans began to form for the emigration to Texas.

==== Crossing the Atlantic ====
Converging at Hamburg, they traveled to Hull, England, where they were expecting to begin their voyage across the sea. Upon arrival they found their intention to travel on one large ship was fouled as two smaller ships awaited them. After negotiating and waiting for news to come back, their would-be ship line transported them to their requested ship among the White Star Line's line of packet ships, the Ben Nevis in Liverpool, England.

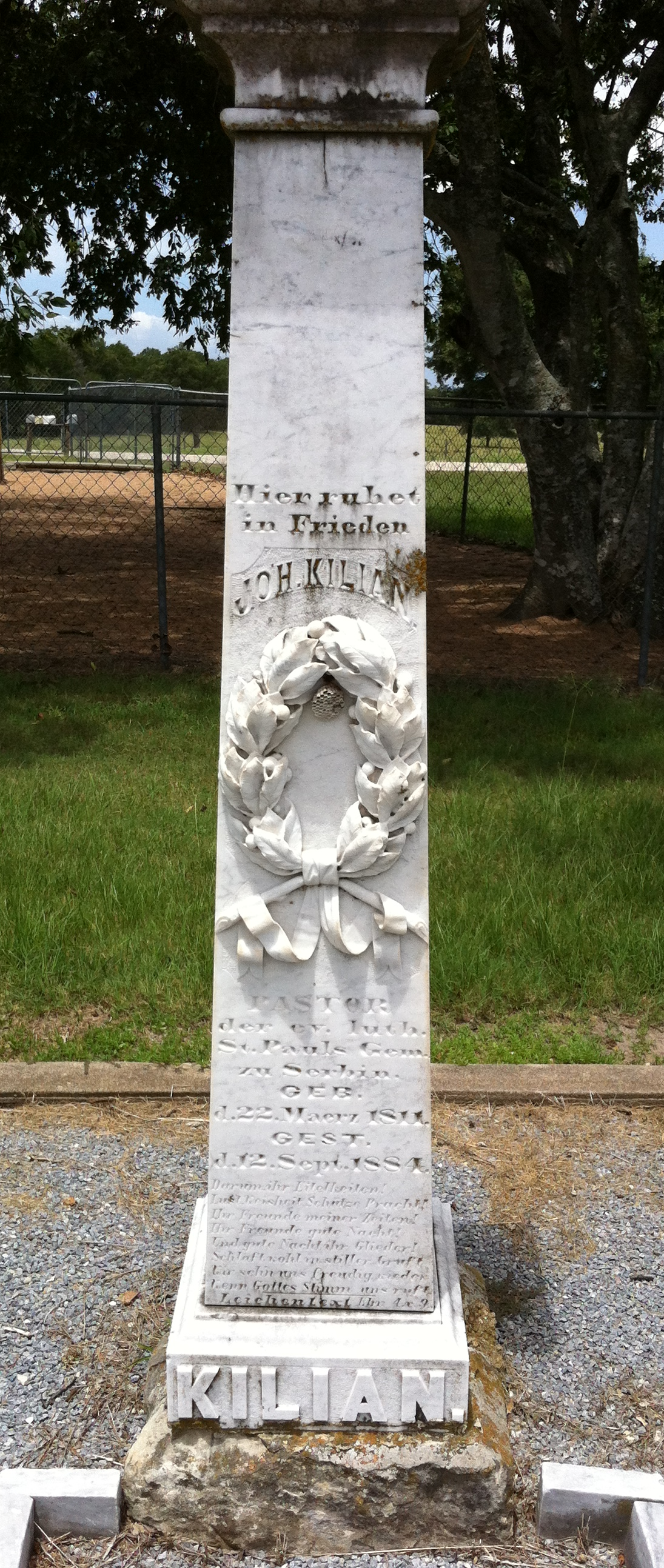
Kilian's gravestone in Serbin, in German

While in Liverpool, the group was exposed to the 1854 Broad Street cholera outbreak. After setting sail, they were forced to drop anchor at Queenstown, Ireland, to have the ship quarantined and the disease complete its cycle. Continuing on, they landed in Galveston, Texas, after passing the health inspection. Finding the largest city of Texas (at that time) beset by yellow fever, they hurriedly continued on to Houston (then about half the size of Galveston). By the time they had left Galveston, a total of 73 had died from various ailments, 55 of which died from cholera.

==== Arrival in Texas ====
Upon arrival in Houston, many of the Wends did not have enough money to continue the journey inland other than to travel on foot, carrying what they could. Along the way many stopped short of the congregation's planned destination in other German communities. Ultimately arriving in present-day Lee County, they founded the Low Pin Oak Settlement (now Serbin, Texas).

==== Settlement ====
Through their first winter they survived in little more than dug-outs and meager shelters. Through the coming year, they finished building their first church and school, and continued to preserve their culture. Kilian persevered, preaching in both Sorbian and German as more German migrants moved closer. Eventually he added English to the list of his preaching languages. The use of German had made such inroads into the community that gravestones for Kilian and his family were carved in German. His sons continued the Wendish preaching and teaching, but with them ended the last of major Wendish language exposure to the small colony.

==== Civil War era ====
The Wendish valued strong work ethic and having emigrated seeking liberty, did not feel it necessary to participate in slave ownership. Many Wendish homesteads continued to grow and develop profitable cotton crop during this time. As a result of high premiums on cotton from the Union blockade of the Gulf and borders, the Wends smuggled cotton for sale on European Markets, evading federal troops and bandits and boosting the economy.

Several Wendish men served in 1st Battalion Infantry, Waul's Texas Legion, having been recruited by a Captain Robert Voigt, Company C. The unit was eventually captured and sent to detainment by federal troops in 1863 at Yazoo City. Among C Company was a Wend, Johann Kieschnik, who, while in custody, was immediately sought out by his captors for his services as a shoemaker. Several Wendish men became seriously ill, and died in federal captivity.

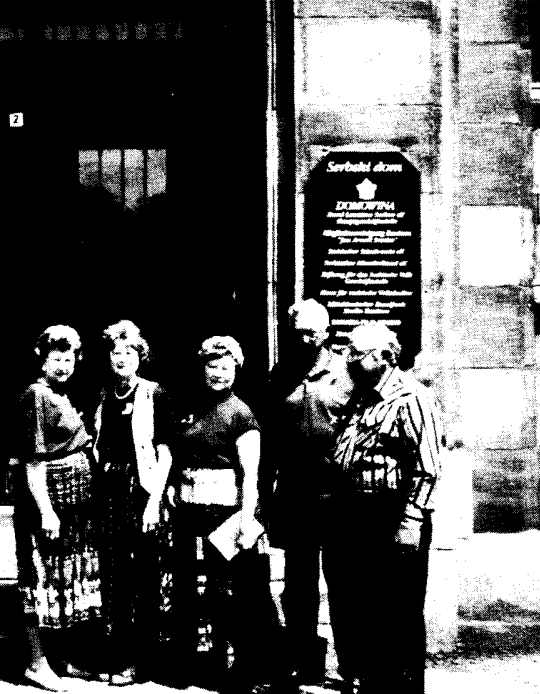
Texas Wends at the Domowina in Bautzen, June 1994

=== Twentieth century ===
Expanding land and economic opportunities enticed many to start new Wendish communities and churches throughout Texas and gradually throughout the United States. This intensified following the Second World War, with many Wendish families moving to cities across the world. During this time, Concordia University Texas began studying and documenting the Texas Wends and their journey, leading to the development of the Texas Wendish Heritage Museum near the original St. Paul Church, Cemetery, and Picnic Ground. This study began to bring the Wends back together, represented by a Wendish Festival started in 1988 and is still continuing. In the 1990s, the Wends began organizing trips to the Domowina and have sustained relations with the residing Wends of Lusatia.

Very little literature written in Wendish has been translated into German, much less into English. In 2018, a Texas university student translated a collection of seven Wendish poems from German into English. The poems all stressed Wendish identity, written originally in Wendish. In 2018, they had been translated into German by Kito Lorenc and published.

== Present day ==
The towns and surrounding areas of Serbin, Warda, and Giddings are still composed largely of descendants of the original Lusatian pioneers; though without many Wendish speaking pastors, the culture largely exists today in the Texas Wendish Heritage Museum, which continues to publish a newsletter, hosts the annual Wendish Festival, organizes trips for Wends to visit the Domowina, and is open throughout the year with special events, in Serbin, celebrating the traditions and history of the Wends.

With a renewal of the sense of Wendish culture since the 1970s, the Texas Wendish Heritage Society preserves the history and culture of this group with their museum located in Serbin. The 3000+ artifacts, documents, and original log buildings of Johann Killian and his congregation serve as the chief voice of this bygone era. A Wendish Fest has occurred annually every fourth Sunday in September since 1988 to celebrate Wendish culture, traditions, and background. The festival has grown to be a premiere celebration of Wendish culture, with attendants from all over the world gathering to share their stories, eat Wendish noodles and streusel coffee cake, participate in cross-cut saw and other traditional competitions, and keep alive the way of life brought from Lusatia. They continue to decorate eggs in their cultural fashion and their egg noodles are never far from the table.

The original church bell, having been brought from Lusatia and since replaced in the St. Paul Lutheran Church's bell tower, now rests at Concordia University Texas in Austin. That institution was founded by Texas Wends and is affiliated with the Lutheran Church–Missouri Synod.

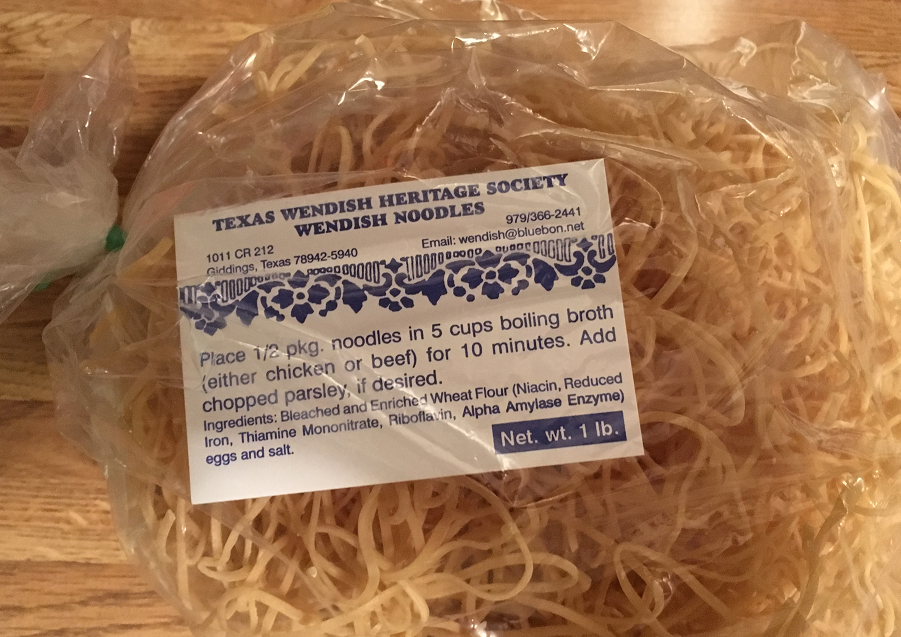
Bag of Wendish noodles, made by volunteers as a fundraiser for the museum.

== See also ==
- Mato Kósyk
- Giddings Deutsches Volksblatt which had articles in Wendish
- Texas Silesian
- Czech Texans
- Sorbian Americans

== Other sources ==
- Blasig, A. (1957) The Wends of Texas. The Naylor Company. San Antonio, Texas. ASIN B0007DXAP2 OCLC 1224161
- Caldwell, L. (1961) Texas Wends: Their first half-century - With historical, biographical & genealogical information on the Serbin Wends, the Schatte & Moerbe families in particular. (The Anson Jones Press. Salado, Texas) ASIN B0007E9MBC
- Cravens, Craig and David Zersen, editors. Transcontinental Encounters: Central Europe Meets the American Heartland (Austin, TX: Concordia University Press, 2005)
- Engerrand, G.C. (1934) So-Called Wends of Germany and their Colonies in Texas and Australia. (University of Texas bulletin, no. 3417. Austin, Texas: The University) ISBN 0-88247-188-0
- Grider, S. (1982) The Wendish Texans. (The University of Texas Institute of Texan Cultures. San Antonio, Texas) ISBN 0-86701-000-2.
- Malinkowa, T. (2009) Shores of Hope: Wends Go Overseas (Austin: Concordia University Press) ISBN 978-1-881848-12-7
- Malinkowa, Trudla, ed. 2014. Jan Kilian (1811–1884). Pastor, Poet, Emigrant. Sammelband der internationalen Konferenz zum 200. Geburtstag des lutherischen Geistlichen, Bautzen, 23.–24. September 2011. Papers of the International Conference on the Occasion of the 200th Birthday of the Lutheran Minister, Bautzen, 23–24 September 2011. [each chapter in both German & English] Bautzen: Domowina Verlag.
- Nielsen, G. (1989) In Search of Home, Nineteenth-Century Wendish Immigration (College Station: Texas A & M University Press) ISBN 0-89096-400-9.
- Wukasch, Charles. A Rock Against Alien Waves: A History of the Wends Second Edition (Austin: Concordia University Press, 2008)
- Zersen, David. An Exciting Find in a Wendish Vault in Texas. Concordia Historical Institute Quarterly. Fall 2012.
- Zersen, David, ed. The Poetry and Music of Jan Kilian (Austin: Concordia University Press, 2011)
