= Giddings Deutsches Volksblatt =

The Giddings Deutsches Volksblatt was a trilingual German-American newspaper published in Giddings, Texas. Most of the content was in German, while many stories were in English and some short supplements were in Wendish (Sorbian), the language of Wendish settlers in that area of Texas, especially in nearby Serbin. In early years of publication, the newspaper included a Sorbian supplement. The Deutsches Volksblatt was designed to serve the German Texan community and especially the Wends scattered throughout Texas.

J. A. Proske and W. C. Vogel founded the newspaper in 1899. A sample issue was published on September 12 of that year, while the first full issue was published on October 1 of that year. The owners of the newspaper discontinued it in 1949 and transferred the subscriptions to their English-language newspaper, the Giddings Star.

== See also ==
- German language newspapers in the United States
- Wends of Texas
