= Warda, Texas =

Unincorporated community in Texas, US

Coordinates: 30°03′19″N 96°54′50″W

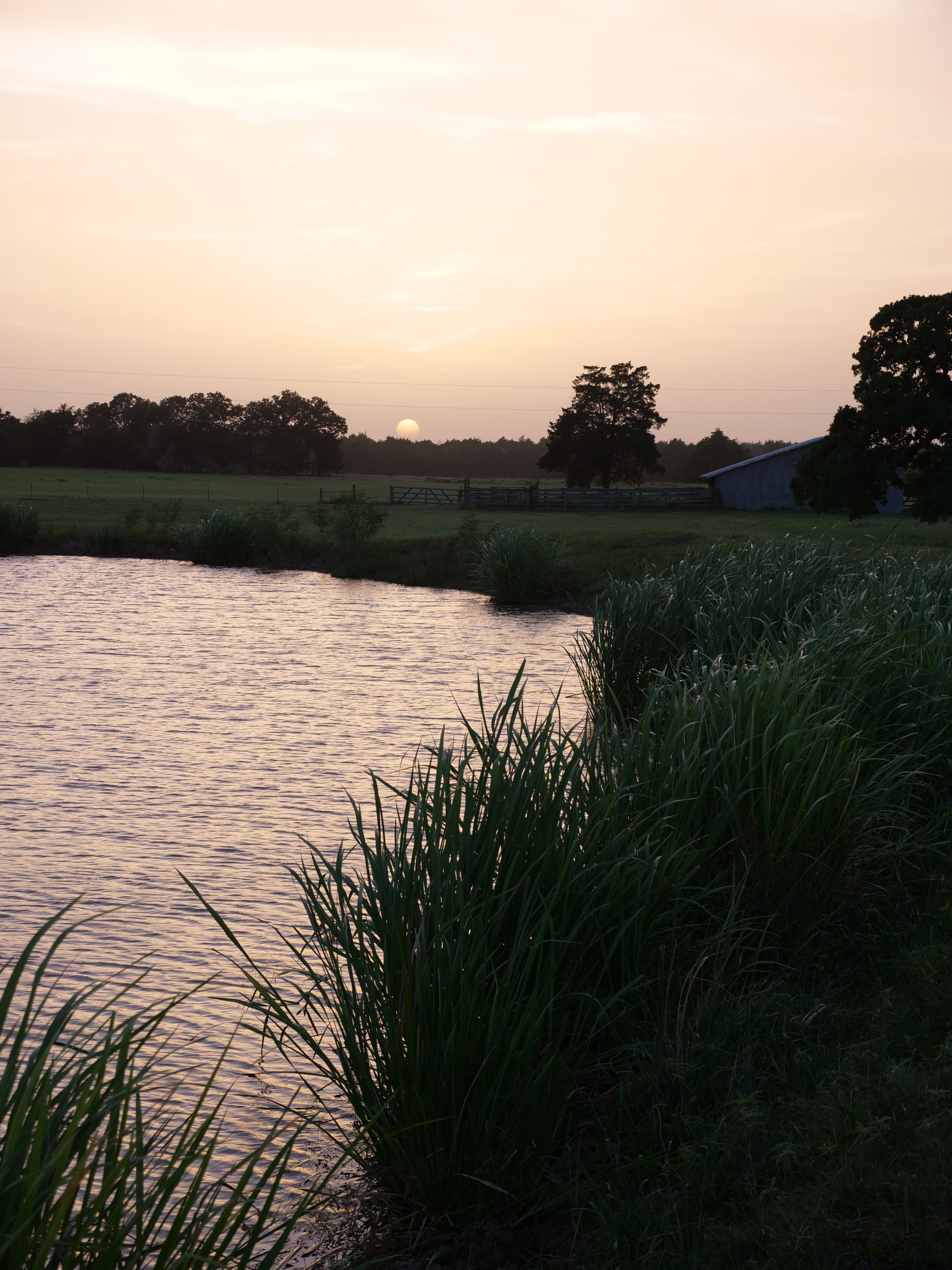
A sunset view from a Warda homestead, 2018

Warda is an unincorporated community in northern Fayette County, Texas, United States. The area was settled in 1854 by the Wends of Texas. Although it is unincorporated, Warda maintains a post office, with the ZIP code 78960.
