= Kubschütz =

Kubschütz/Kubšicy
- Municipality
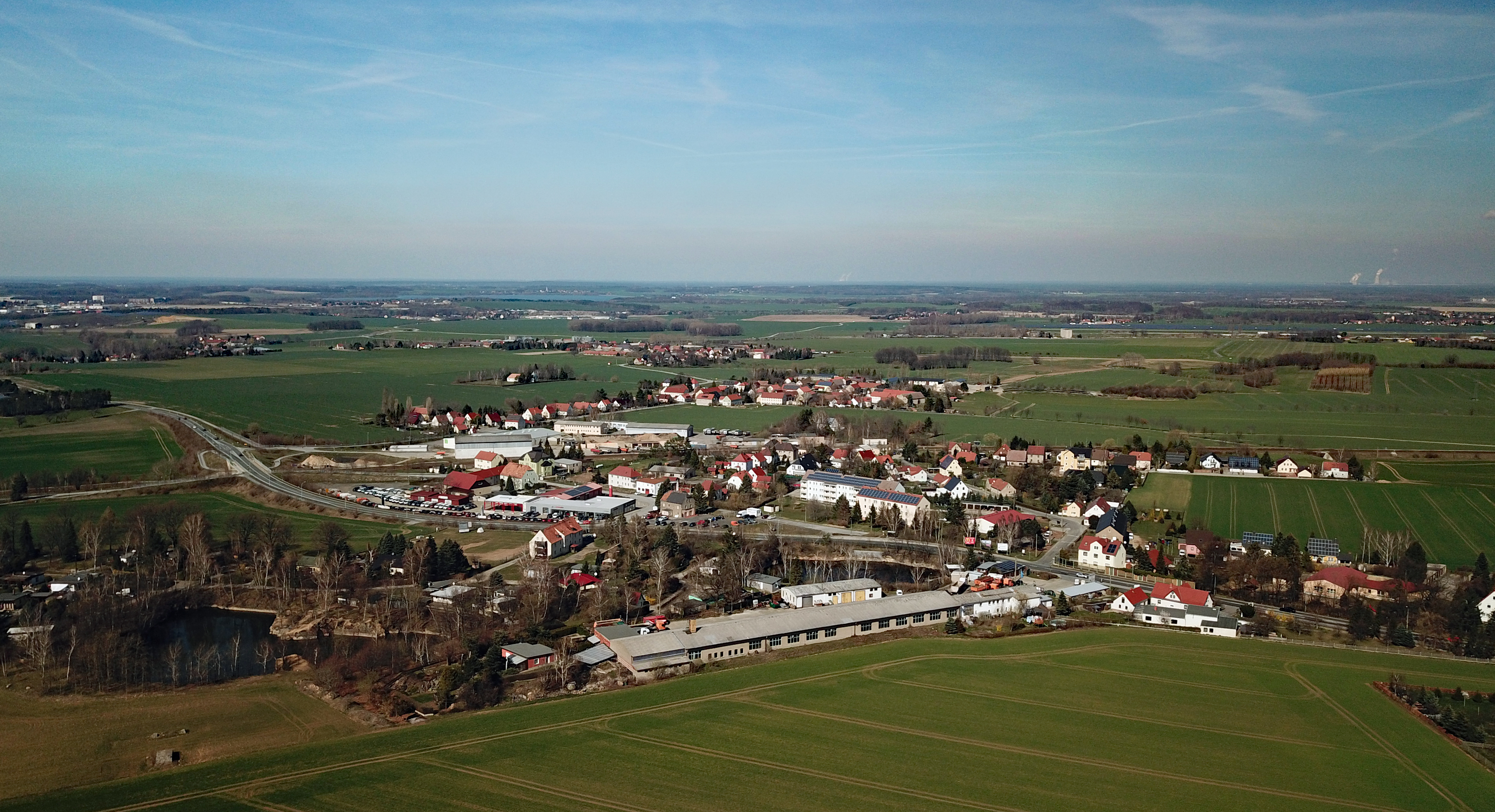

- Location of Kubschütz/Kubšicy within Bautzen district
- Interactive map of Kubschütz/Kubšicy
- Location within Germany Location within Saxony
- Coordinates: 51°10′N 14°30′E
- Country: Germany
- State: Saxony
- District: Bautzen
- Subdivisions: 24

Government
  - Mayor (2022–29): Olaf Reichert

Area
  - Total: 43.53 km^{2} (16.81 sq mi)
- Elevation: 205 m (673 ft)

Population (2025-12-31)
  - Total: 2,427
  - Density: 55.75/km^{2} (144.4/sq mi)
- Demonym(s): German: Kubschützer; Upper Sorbian: Kubšičan (m.), Kubšičanka (f.)
- Time zone: UTC+01:00 (CET)
  - Summer (DST): UTC+02:00 (CEST)
- Postal codes: 02627
- Dialling codes: 03591
- Vehicle registration: BZ, BIW, HY, KM
- Website: www.gemeinde-kubschuetz.de

Kubschütz (German) or Kubšicy (Upper Sorbian, pronounced [ˈkupʃitsɨ]) is a municipality in the district of Bautzen, in Saxony, Germany.

The municipality is part of the recognized Sorbian settlement area in Saxony. Upper Sorbian has an official status next to German, and all villages bear names in both languages.

== Villages ==
Several villages belong to the municipality (names given in German/Upper Sorbian):

Baschütz/Bošecy; Blösa/Brězow; Canitz-Christina/Konjecy; Daranitz/Torońca; Döhlen/Delany; Großkunitz/Chójnica; Grubditz/Hruboćicy; Jenkwitz/Jenkecy; Jeßnitz/Jaseńca; Kreckwitz/Krakecy; Kubschütz/Kubšicy, including Neukubschütz/Nowe Kubšicy; Kumschütz/Kumšicy; Litten/Lětoń	Neupurschwitz/Nowe Poršicy; Pielitz/Splósk; Purschwitz/Poršicy; Rabitz/Rabocy; Rachlau/Rachlow; Rieschen/Zrěšin; Scheckwitz/Šekecy; Soculahora/Sokolca; Soritz/Sowrjecy; Waditz/Wadecy; Weißig/Wysoka; Zieschütz/Cyžecy
