= Slovak Americans =

Americans of Slovak birth or descent

Slovenskí Američania
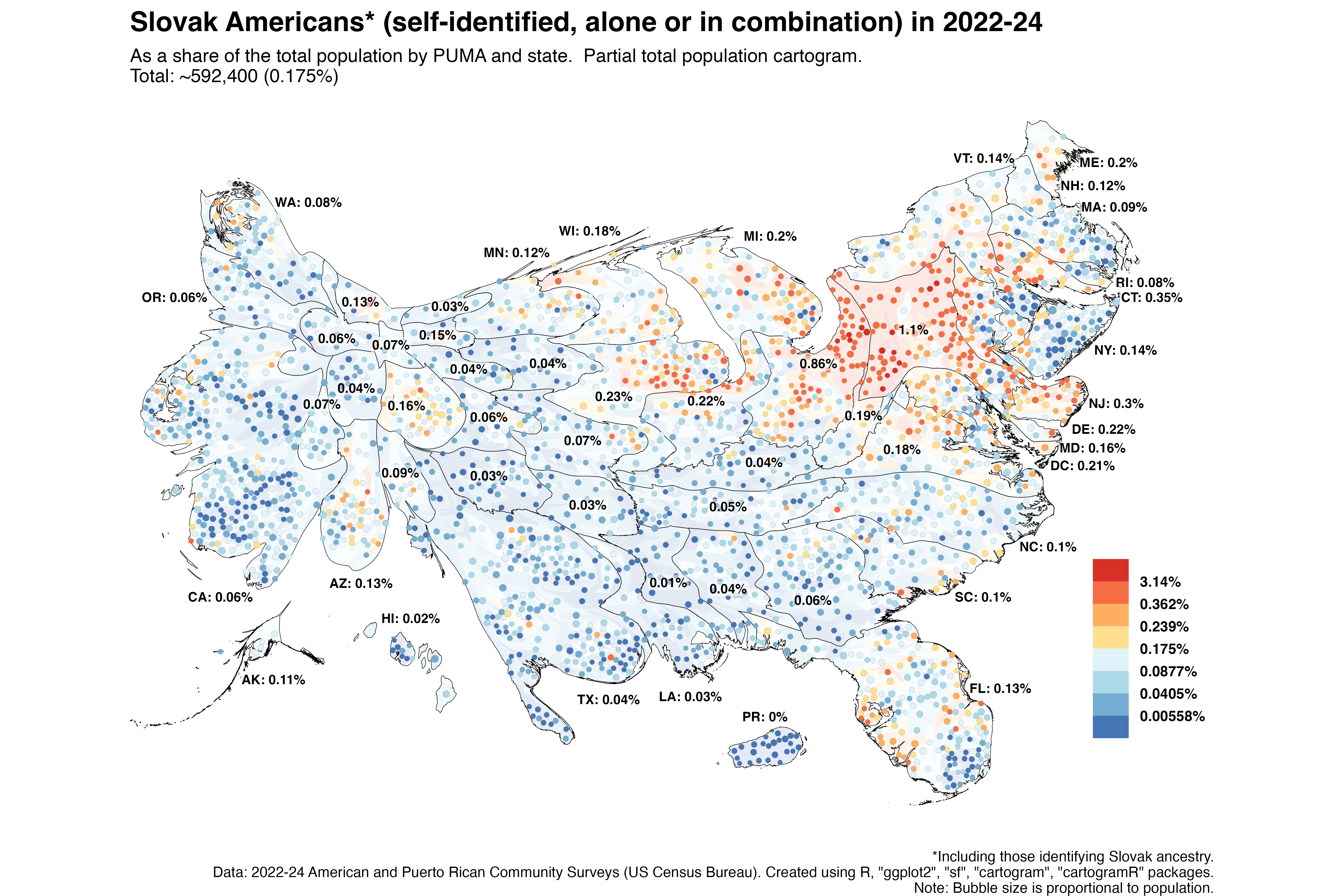

Total population
- 574,325 (2024); 0.17% of the US population

Regions with significant populations
- Pennsylvania (Greater Pittsburgh, Coal Region), Ohio (Greater Cleveland), New York, New Jersey, Illinois, Indiana, California, Michigan, Nebraska, Kansas, Oklahoma, South Dakota, Iowa, Wisconsin, Florida, Minnesota

Languages
- English (American English) · Slovak

Religion
- Roman Catholicism, Greek Catholicism; Lutheranism

Related ethnic groups
- Other Slovaks • Czech Americans • Polish Americans • Kashubian Americans • Texan Silesians • Sorbian Americans

Slovak Americans are Americans of Slovak descent. In the 1990 Census, Slovak Americans made up the third-largest portion of Slavic ethnic groups. In 2000, there were about 790,000 people of Slovak descent living in the United States. As of 2024, there were 574,325 Americans who self-identified as being of Slovak ancestry.

== History ==
=== Eighteenth century ===
Isaacus Ferdinand Šaroši was the first known immigrant from the territory of present-day Slovakia, then part of the Kingdom of Hungary. Šaroši arrived in the religious colony of Germantown, Pennsylvania, founded by Mennonite preacher Francis Daniel Pastorius, to serve as a teacher and a preacher. Šaroši apparently returned to Europe after two years. In 1754, Andreas Jelky, an ethnic German from the village of Baja, left the Kingdom of Hungary to train as a tailor. After some travel in Europe, he eventually reached South American shores, via the West Indies, on a Dutch trading ship.

After being proclaimed emperor in Madagascar and bearing letters of recommendation from Benjamin Franklin and funds from a descendant of Ferdinand Magellan, Maurice Benyovszky whose origin is regarded as a mix of Slovak, Hungarian and Polish came to America and fought with American troops in the American Revolutionary War. He joined General Pulaski's cavalry corps and fought in the siege of Savannah. He died in Madagascar in 1786, but his wife, Zuzana Honsch, stayed in the United States from 1784 until her death in 1815.

Another Slovak fought in the American Revolution; Major Jan Polerecky, who trained at the French Royal Military Academy of St. Cyr, came to America from France to fight with George Washington's army in the War for Independence. He was in the company of the 300 "Blue Hussars" to whom the British formally surrendered their weapons after the defeat of Cornwallis at Yorktown. When the war was over, Polerecky settled in Dresden, Maine, where he served in a number of public positions.

=== 19th century ===
During the American Civil War, Abraham Lincoln approved a request to organize a military company named the "Lincoln Riflemen of Slavonic Origin." This first volunteer unit from Chicago, which included many Slovaks, fought in the Civil War and was eventually incorporated into the 24th Illinois Infantry Regiment. Slovak immigrant, Samuel Figuli, fought in the Civil War, owned a plantation in Virginia, and later joined an exploratory expedition to the North Pole.

Large scale Slovak immigration to the United States began in the 1870s with the forced magyarization policies of the Hungarian government. Because U.S. immigration officials did not keep separate records for each ethnic group within the Austro-Hungarian Empire, it is impossible to determine the exact number of Slovak immigrants who entered the United States. Between 1880 and the mid-1920s, approximately 500,000 Slovaks immigrated to the United States. More than half of Slovak immigrants settled in Pennsylvania. Other popular destinations included Ohio, Illinois, New York and New Jersey. Also, Slovak, Arkansas was founded in 1894 by the Slovak Colonization Company.

=== Twentieth century ===
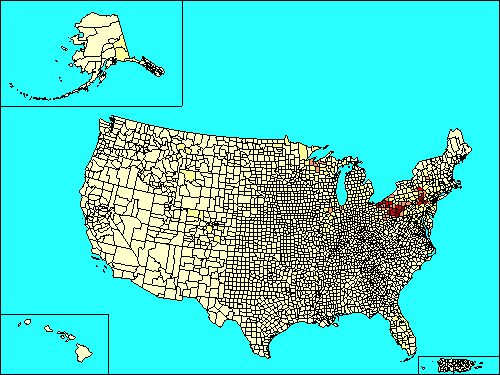
Distribution of Slovak Americans according to the 2000 census,

==== Organization, political activism, and creation of Czechoslovakia ====
Denied a voice in politics and the use of their native Slovak language in public places by the ruling Magyars in Hungary, Slovaks in America became socially and politically active, establishing self-help societies and fraternal organizations (such as Sokol, the Slovak League of America and First Catholic Slovak Union), founding newspapers (such as Slovenský denník, 'Daily Slovak', and Jednota, 'Unity'), and lobbying the government of the United States, especially President Woodrow Wilson's administration, to press for greater freedom for Slovaks who were suffering under Magyar oppression.

In 1910, Slovak and other ethnic leaders in the United States successfully petitioned federal authorities to classify a person by their language, rather than country of origin. On the president's orders, new forms replaced the old ones, and Slovaks were no longer classified as "Austrians" or "Hungarians" in the 1910 U.S. Census.

Slovaks in America were outraged and spurred to greater action by the Černová massacre. On October 27, 1907, parishioners in the Slovak village of Černová wanted Andrej Hlinka to attend the consecration of the village church that he had helped to build, but the ecclesiastical authorities would not permit it. On the day of the consecration, the people tried to stop the Magyar clergy, who came to Černová and the security forces fired into the crowd and killed nine people on the spot with a total of 15 dead by the end of the day. More than 60 people were wounded. The event encouraged a British journalist and academic, Robert W. Seton-Watson, to denounce Budapest's policies towards the nationalities in his book "Racial Problems in Hungary," which he published under the pseudonym Scotus Viator in 1908.

In 1915, the leaders of the Czech National Alliance and the Slovak League of America signed the Cleveland Agreement in which they pledged to co-operate for the common goal of independent statehood for the Czechs and Slovaks. The agreement's five articles laid out the basics of a future joint state for the two nationalities. Three years later, the Pittsburgh Agreement was concluded by representatives of Czechs and Slovaks at a meeting of the American branch of the Czechoslovak National Council in Pittsburgh. The agreement endorsed a program for the struggle for a common state of Czecho-Slovakia and agreed that the new state would be a democratic republic in which Slovakia would have its own administration, legislature, and courts. On October 18, 1918, the primary author of the agreement, T. G. Masaryk, whose father was Slovak and mother Moravian, declared the independence of Czechoslovakia on the steps of Independence Hall in Philadelphia, Pennsylvania. He was elected the first president of an independent Czechoslovakia in 1920. However, he broke his promise of Slovak autonomy.

In 1970, the Slovak World Congress was founded in New York. It became the leading organization of Slovaks living abroad and represented associations, institutions, and individuals.

==== Communist control of Czechoslovakia ====
Communists took control of Czechoslovakia's government in 1948, leading to a mass migration of Slovak intelligentsia and post-war political figures. Another wave of Slovak immigration was fueled by the Soviet Union's invasion of Czechoslovakia in 1968, the Soviet response to the cultural and political liberalization of the Prague Spring. Many members of this wave belonged to the intelligentsia.

==== Democracy and independence ====
The period from 1989 to 1993 is described as the period of democracy and independence and resulted in the Second Slovak Republic in 1993 with a new constitution and flag. Termed the Velvet Divorce, the period marked Western influences and a new autonomy for the Slovak Republic with separate national standards and ratings for education, the economy, and other government functions. It was only in 2002 that Slovakia was invited, along with six other Central European Nations, to join NATO. The historian Stanislav Kinselbaum, born in Prague and Western-educated, noted that first free postcommunist elections in Slovakia were held in June 1990.

== Demography ==
Most Slovaks emigrated to cities, especially to those where industries were expanding and felt the need to acquire cheap and unskilled labor. For this reason, the majority of Slovaks settled in the Eastern United States (with special attention to Pennsylvania) where more than half of them settled in milltowns and coal mining districts in the state's western region. Today, almost half of all Slovak Americans reside in Pennsylvania (233,160) and Ohio (137,343). Other important areas where Slovaks settled include New Jersey, New York, and Illinois. Most Slovaks settled in places where there were already Slovaks residing. In fact, between 1908 and 1910, the percentage of Slovaks who settled in places already inhabited by family and friends was 98.4 percent.

== See also ==
- European Americans
- List of Slovaks
- Slovak National Catholic Church
- Hungarian Slovak Roma in the United States
- Slovakia–United States relations
