= Serbin, Texas =

- Unincorporated community
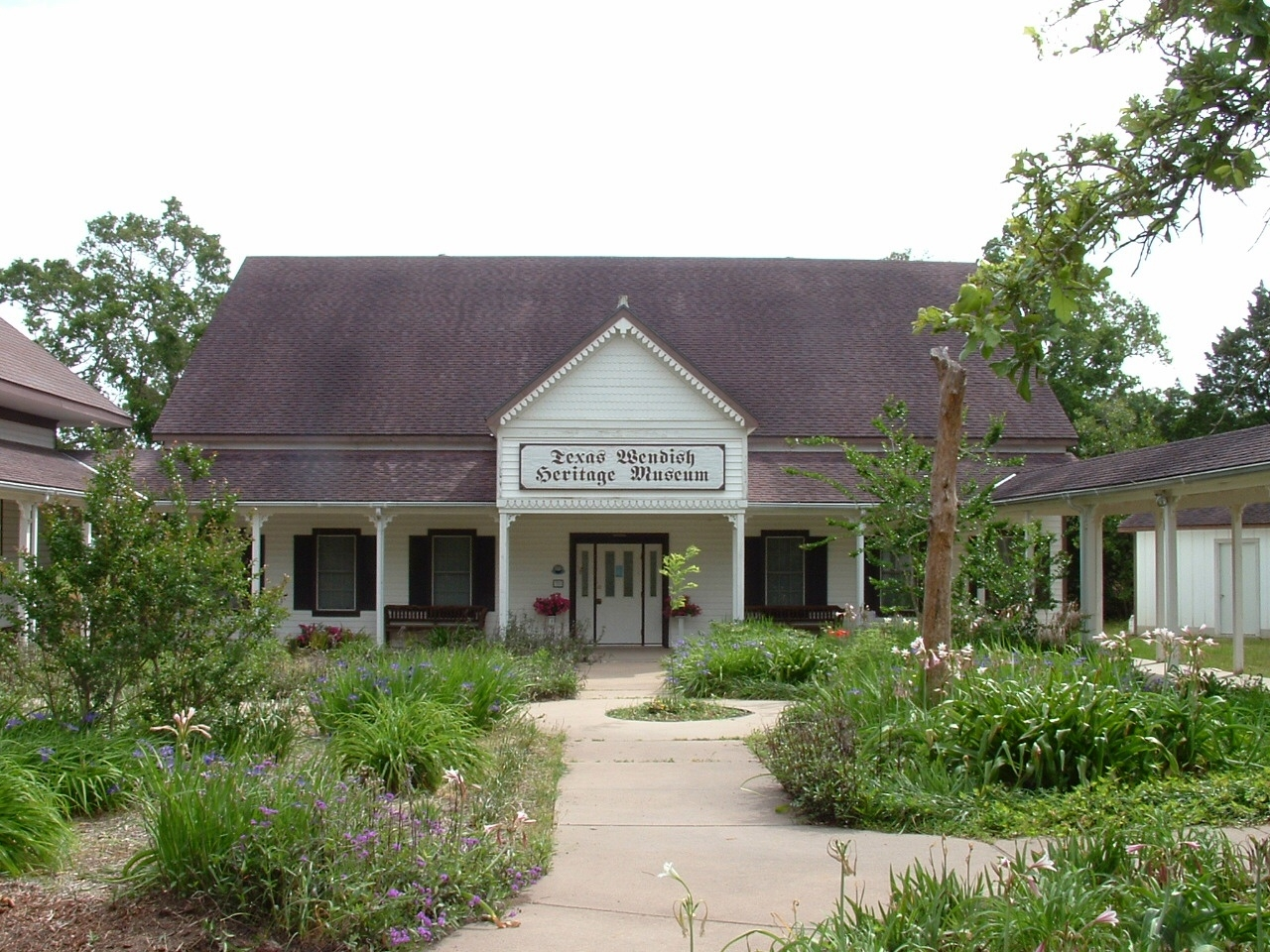
- Texas Wendish Heritage Museum

- Location in Texas Location in the United States
- Coordinates: 30°6′54″N 96°59′17″W
- Country: United States
- State: Texas
- County: Lee
- Time zone: UTC-6 (Central (CST))
  - Summer (DST): UTC-5 (CDT)
- ZIP code: 78942
- Area code: 979

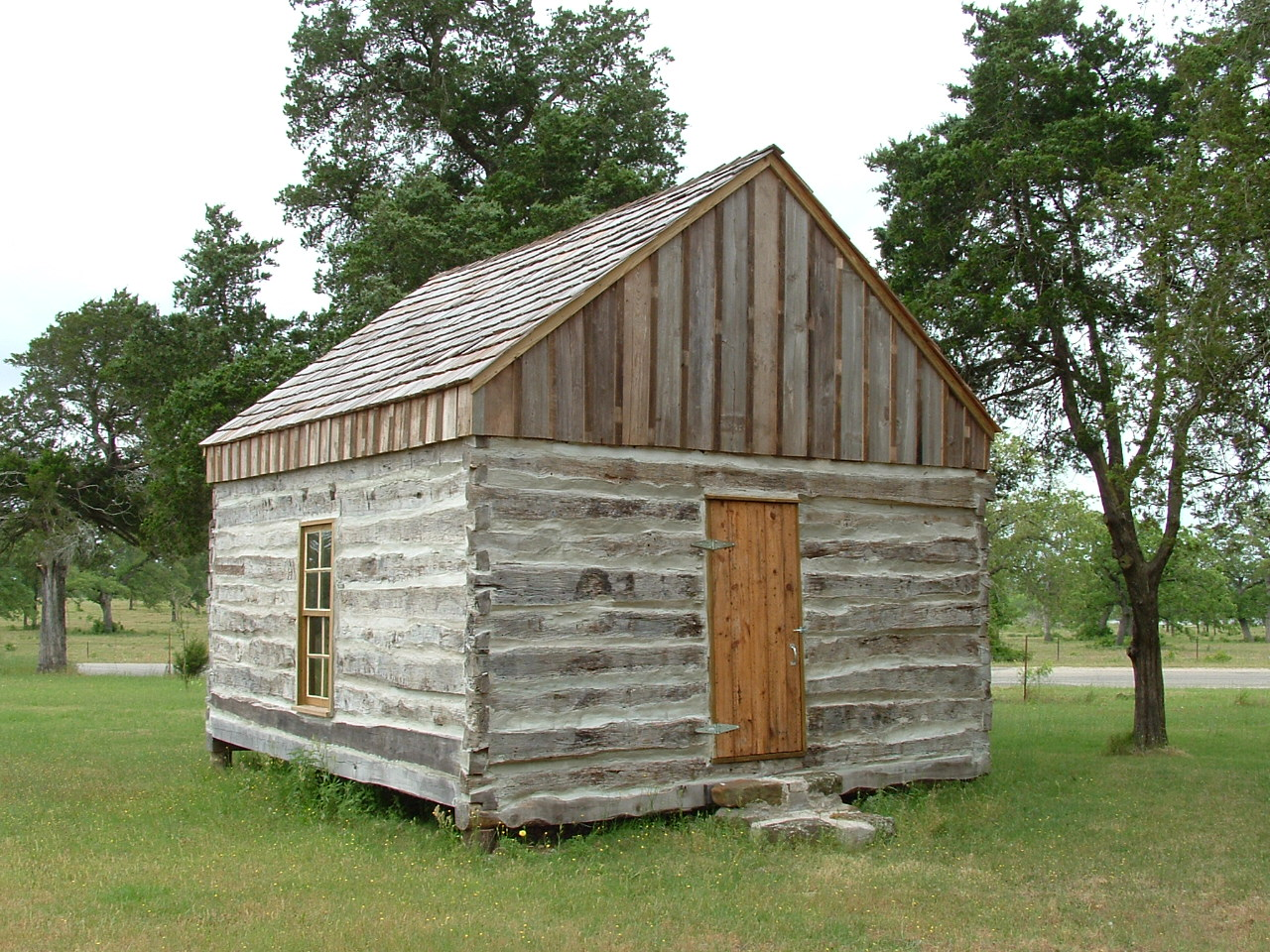
A Wendish pioneer log cabin on the grounds of St. Paul Lutheran Church was the home of John Kilian, as well as serving as the school and church.

Serbin is an unincorporated community in southwestern Lee County, Texas, United States. Located about 50 miles (80 km) east of Austin, it was originally established as Low Pin Oak Settlement (Upper Sorbian: Niske Pin-dubowe sydlišćo, Lower Sorbian: Niske pin-dubowe sedlišćo) by Sorbian (Wendish) immigrants to Texas in the mid-1850s. The community's name was changed to Serbin, meaning "Sorbian land" in the Sorbian language, prior to 1860. The West Slavic Sorbs are distinct from the South Slavic Serbs, although the names of the two Slavic ethnic groups have a common origin.

The largest single migration of Sorbian immigrants to the United States settled in Texas, using Serbin as the "mother colony". On September 20, 1854, about 550 Sorbian Lutherans from congregations in Lusatia, Prussia, and Saxony left for Texas under the leadership and pastoral care of John Kilian.

Upon arriving in Texas, the people of present-day Serbin became the earliest members of the Lutheran Church–Missouri Synod in Texas. St. Paul Lutheran Church, built in 1871, is a typical example of Wendish architecture and is still in full use; the pulpit is located above the altar, in the front balcony of the church, as seen in the photos of the interior.

The Texas Wendish Heritage Museum is housed in Serbin on the St. Paul church grounds. Occupying three independent buildings including a former St. Paul parochial school building, the museum also has two outdoor exhibits of an intact log cabin and part of a dogtrot house.

Eventually, the Sorbian language in Serbin was replaced by German and English. Kilian even had the tombstone for his wife Maria carved in German in 1881, not Sorbian; the same was done for his stone in 1884.

Neither of the two Sorbian languages is still fluently or regularly spoken in Serbin. According to the 2000 U.S. census, only 37 people in the 78942 ZIP Code area (which also includes Giddings and other nearby towns) spoke a Slavic language other than Polish or Russian at home.

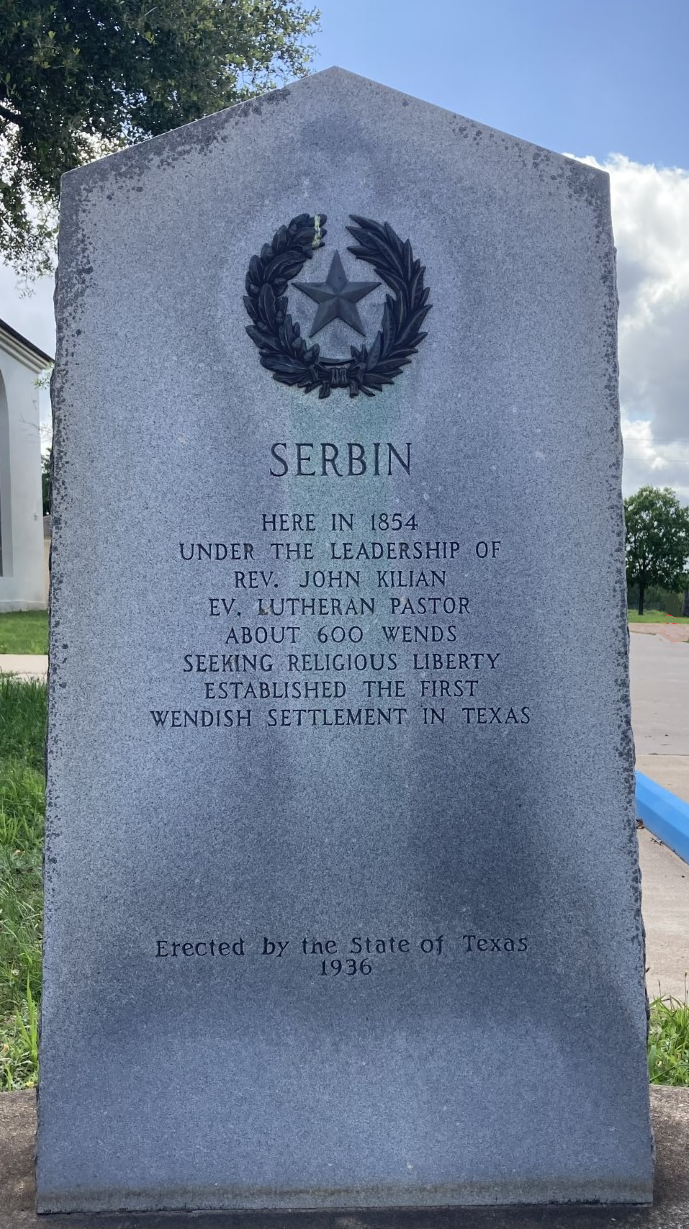
1936 historical marker

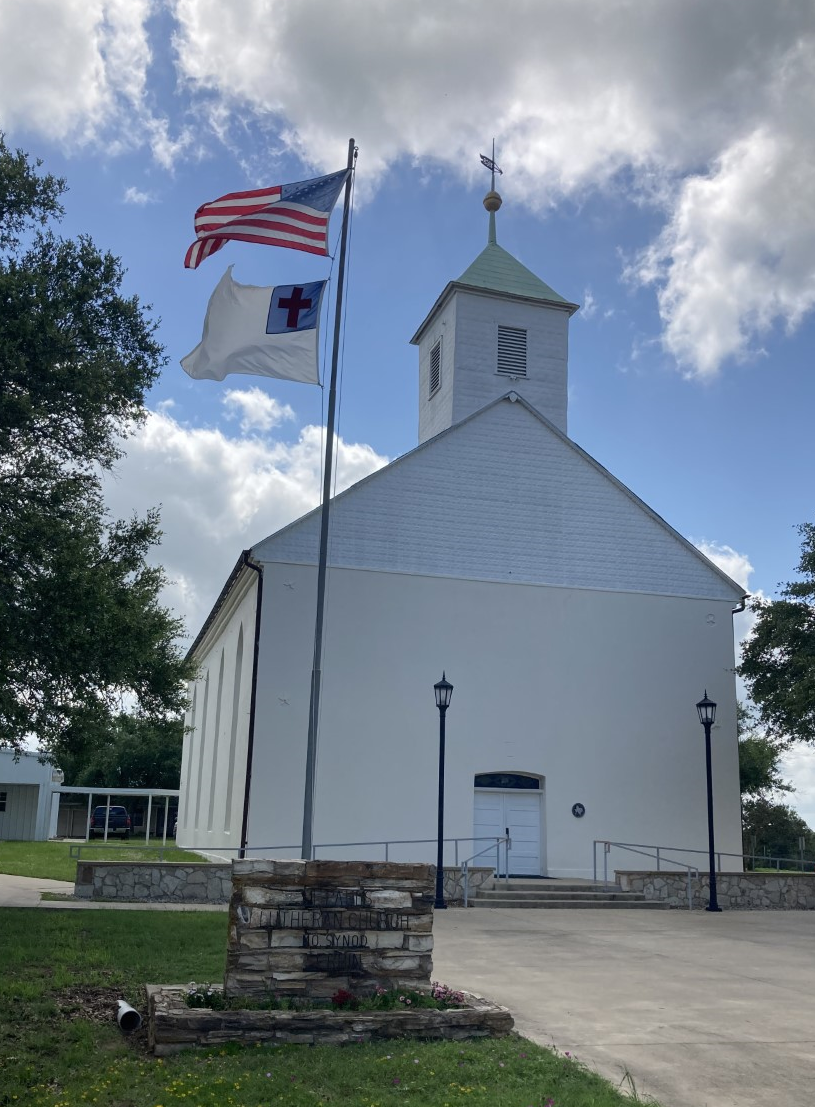
Front of St. Paul Lutheran Church

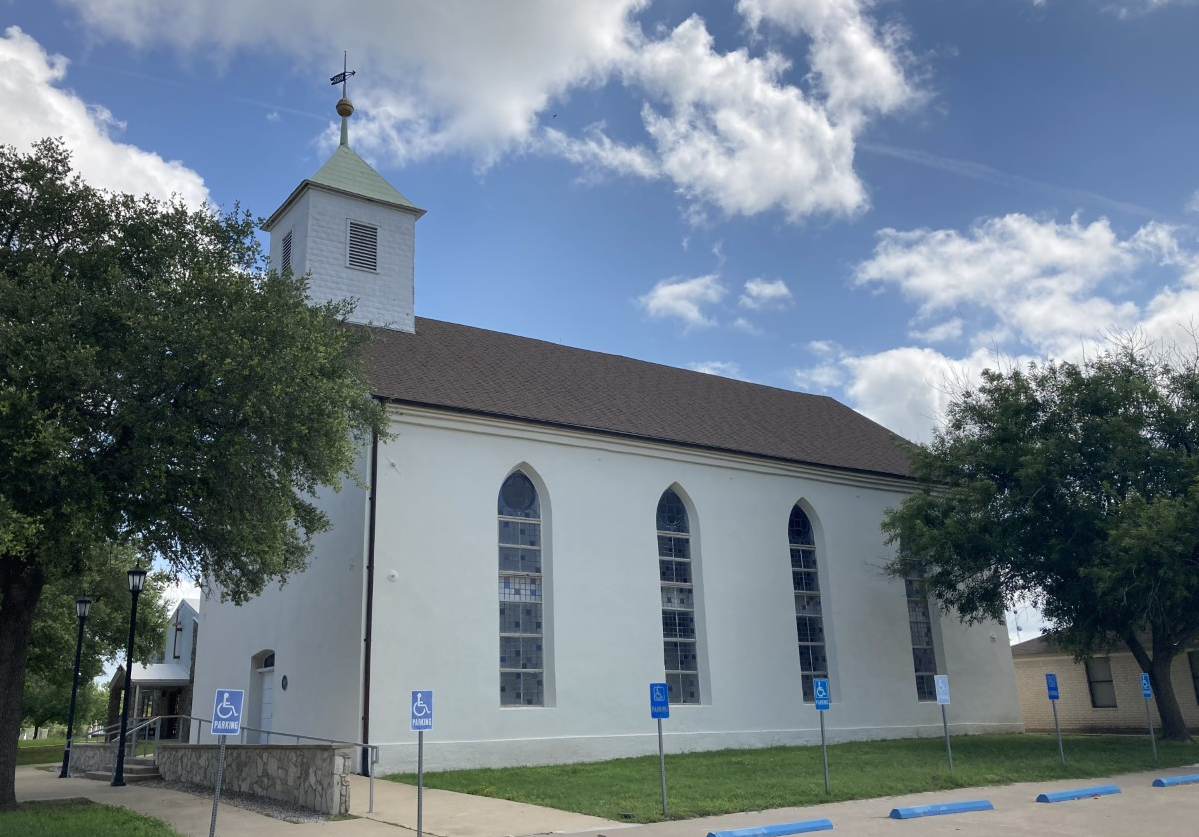
Exterior view of the church

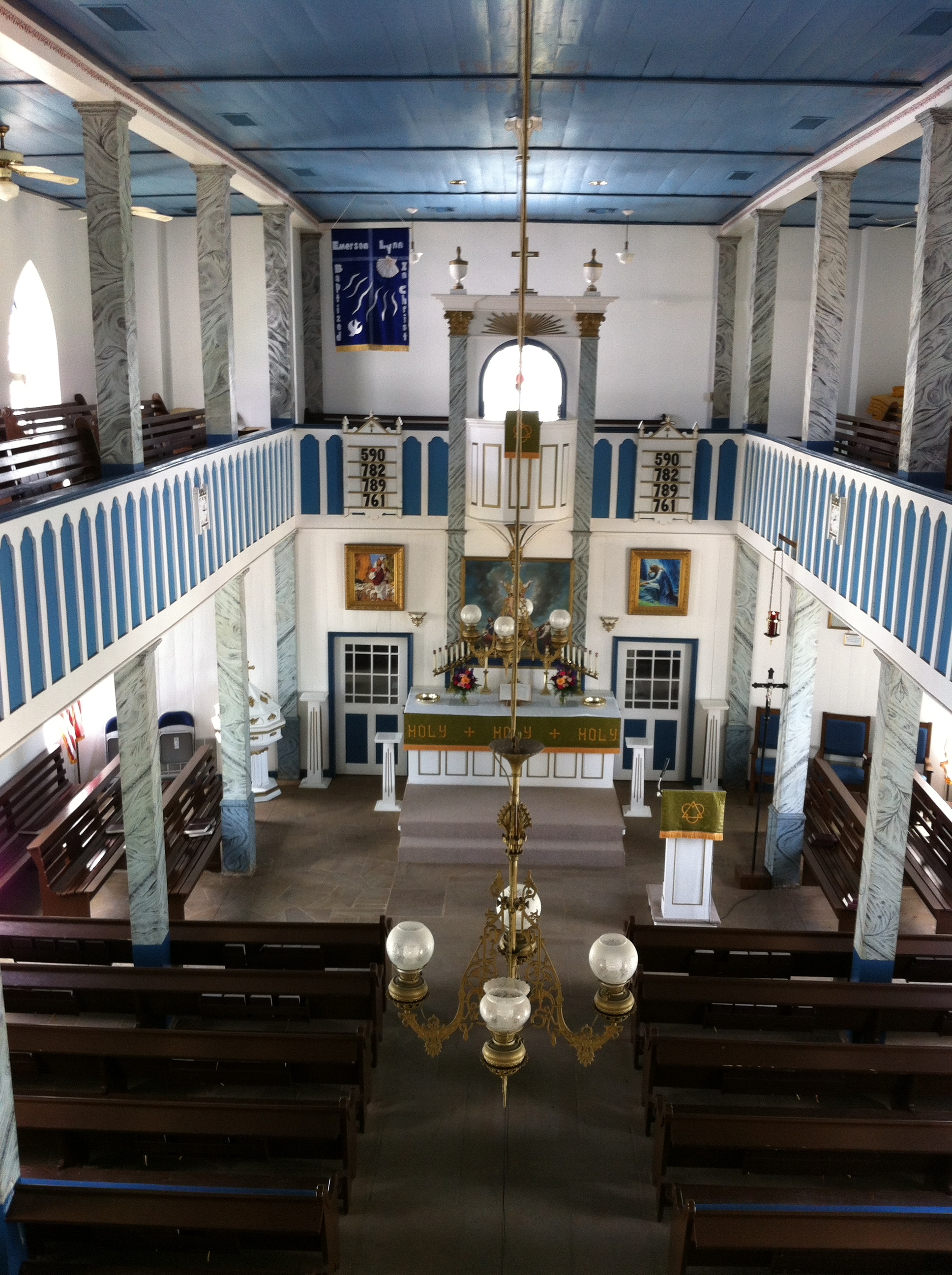
Interior of St. Paul Lutheran, seen from balcony

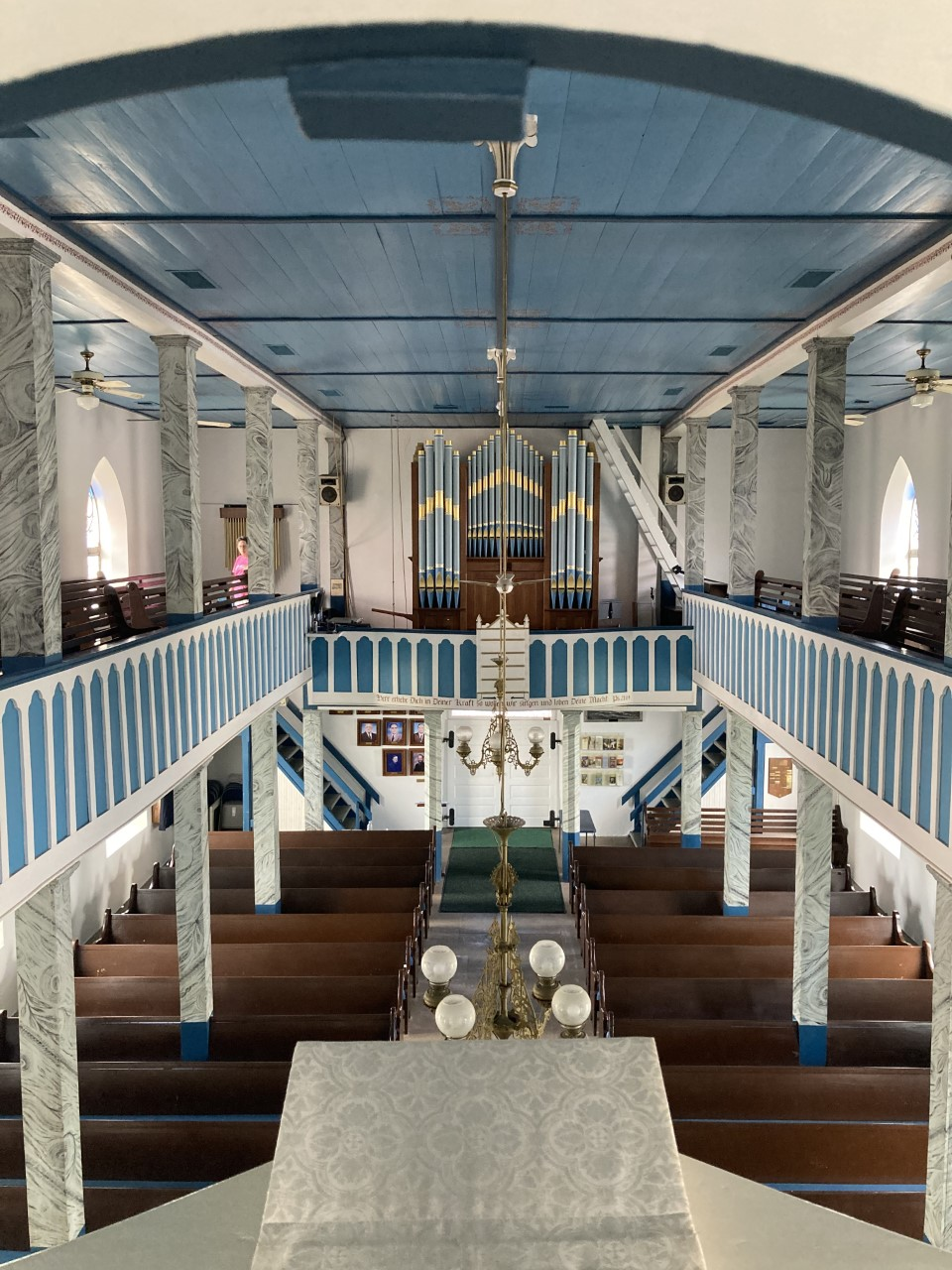
Interior of St. Paul's Lutheran Church, seen from the pulpit

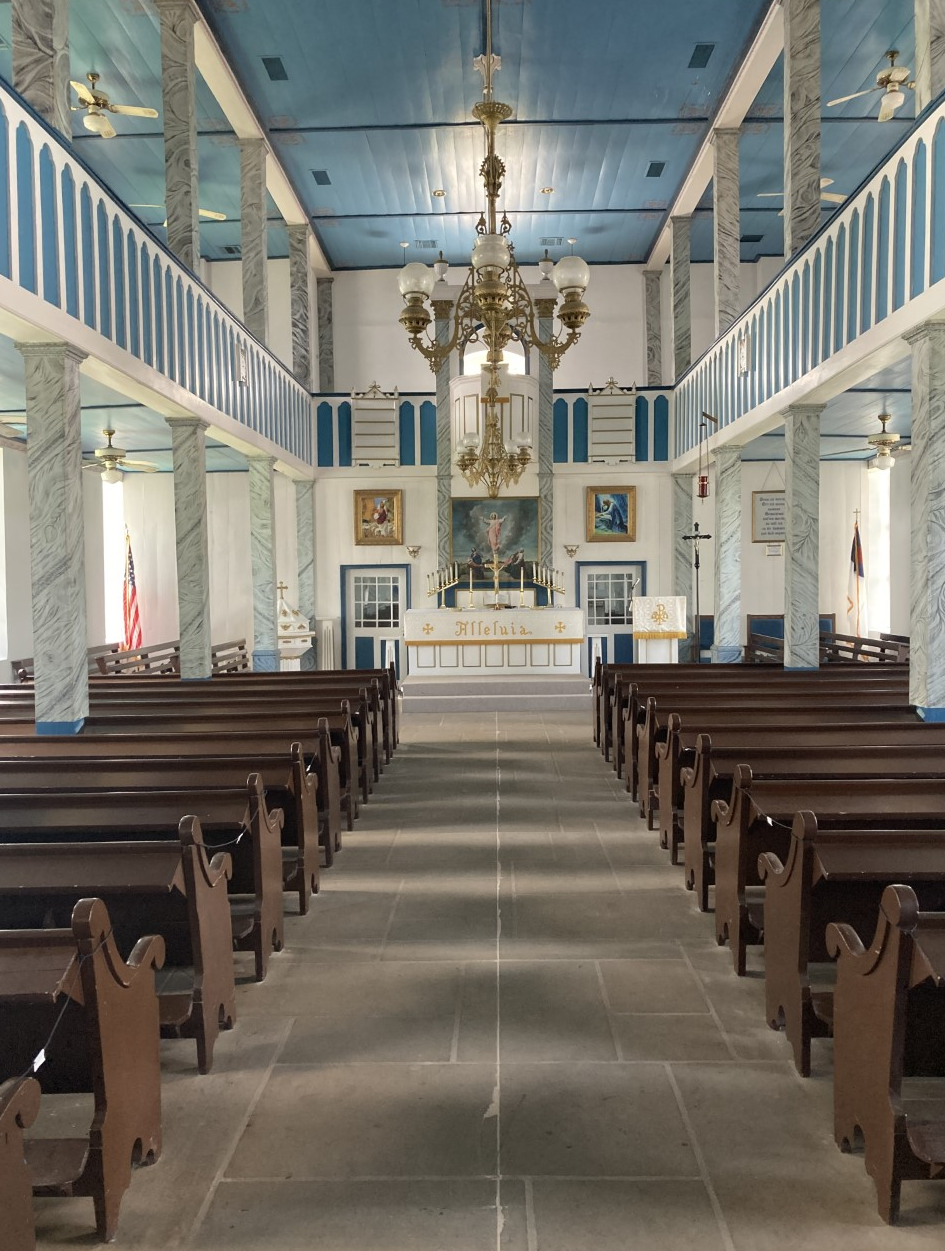
Floor level view of the altar

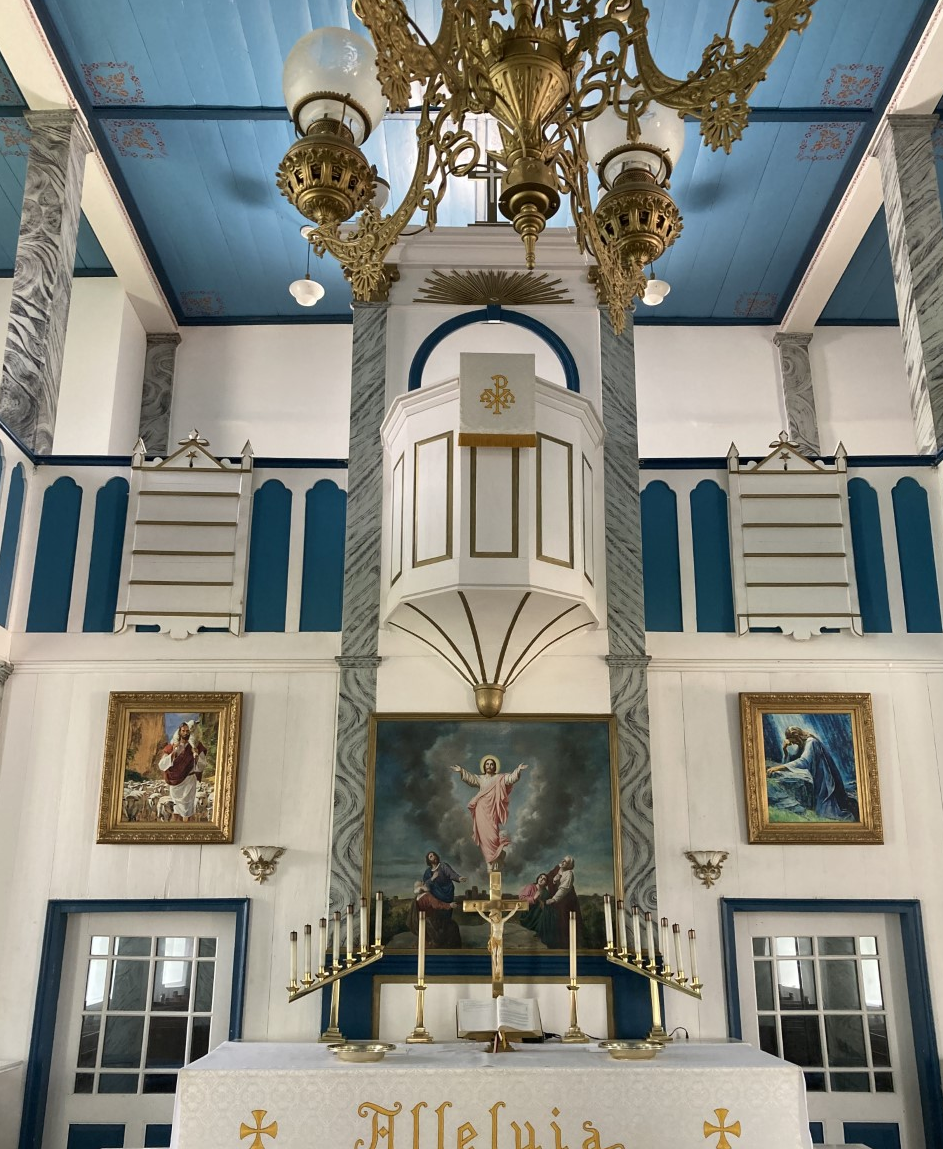
View of the altar and the pulpit

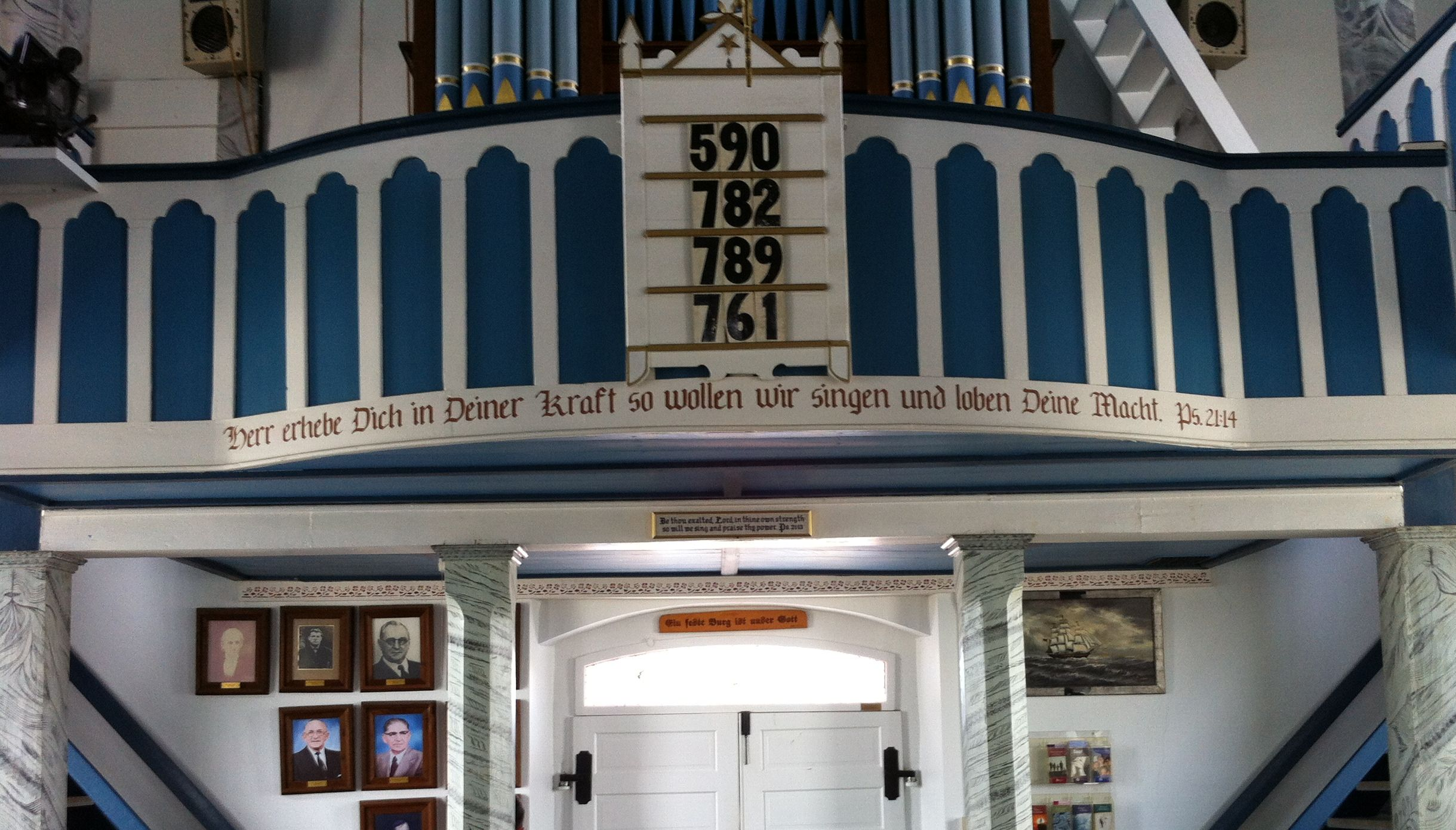
Interior of the church, facing the rear, showing the Bible verse in German, not Wendish/Sorbian

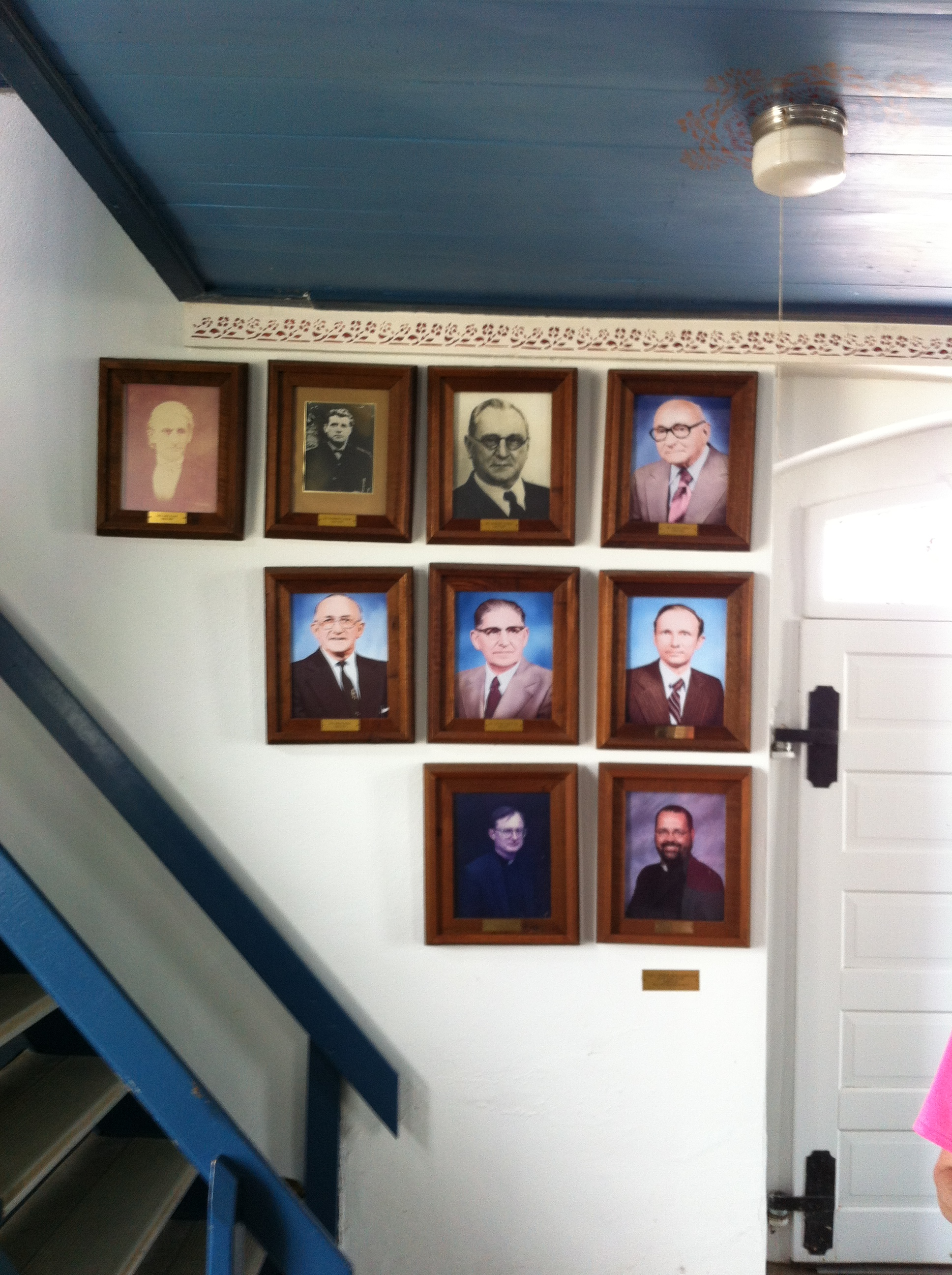
Photos of the pastors who have served the congregation

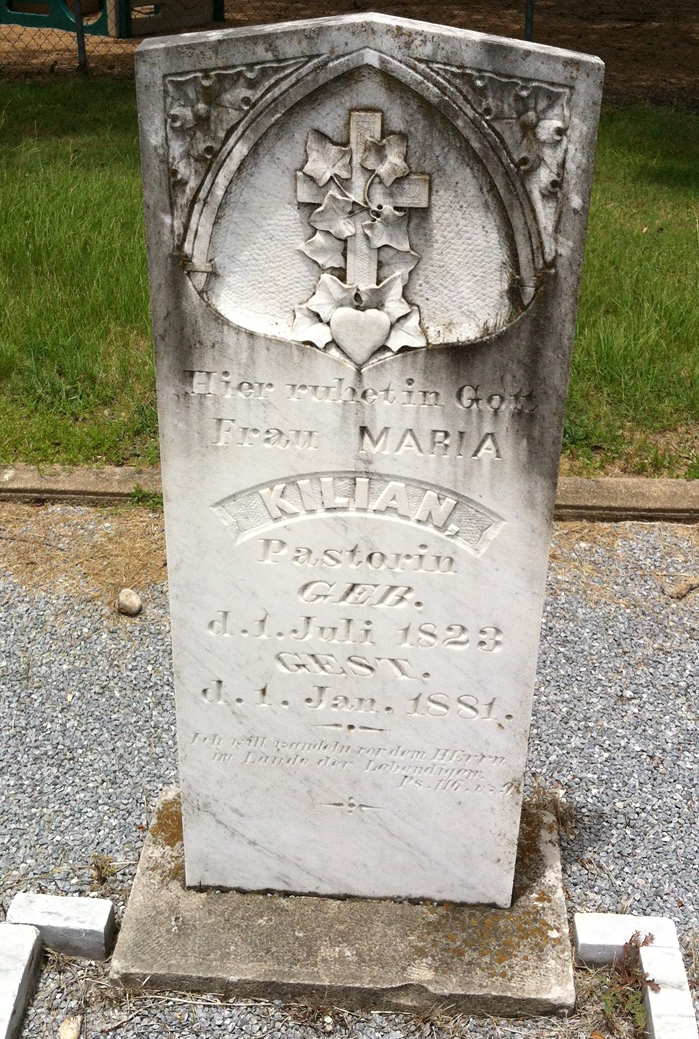
Maria Kilian's gravestone, in German

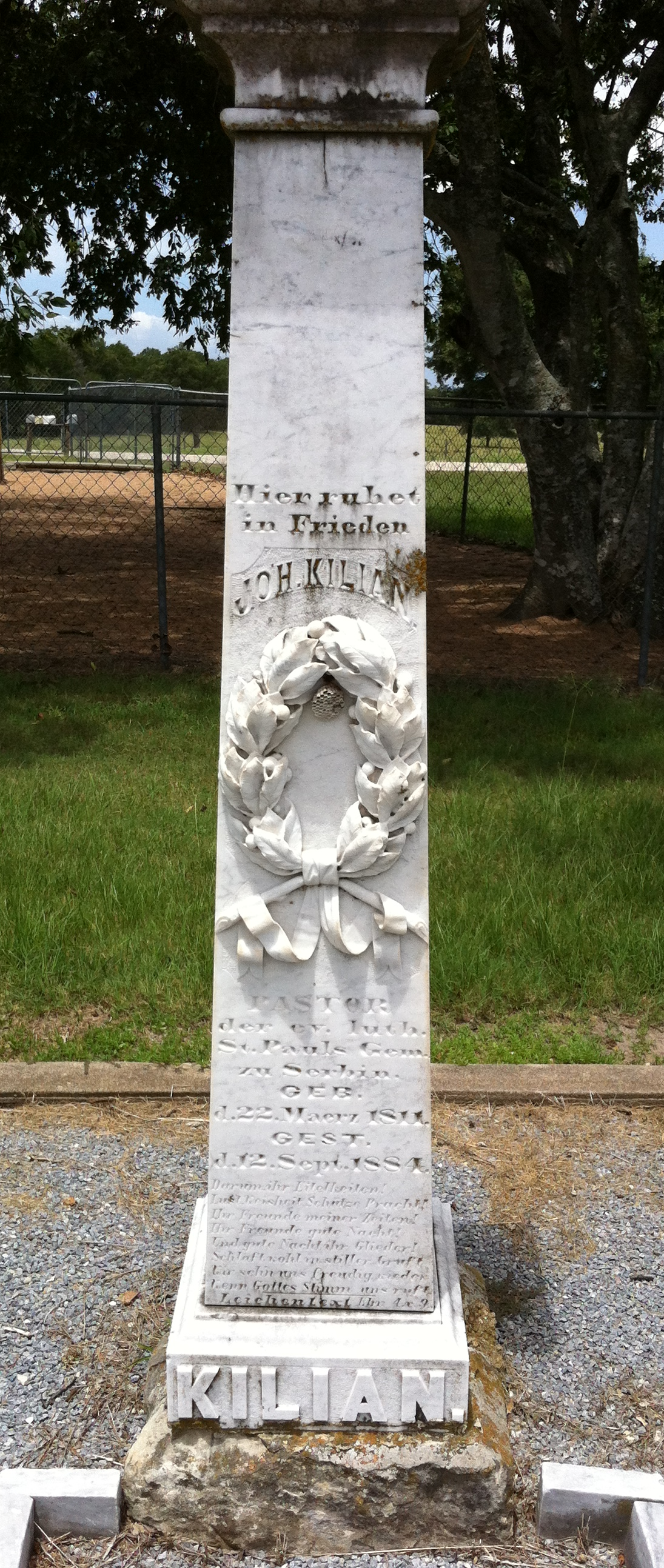
John Kilian's gravestone, in German
