= Sorbian studies =

Academic discipline

Sorbian studies is an academic discipline dealing with Sorbian language and literature. It is a subfield of Slavic studies.

== Current situation ==
The only institute for Sorbian studies is at Leipzig University (German: Institut für Sorabistik; Upper Sorbian: Institut za sorabistiku). The University of Potsdam publishes the series Potsdamer Beiträge zur Sorabistik. Furthermore, the Sorbian Institute is conducting research in Sorbian studies and biannually publishes Lětopis, the only journal on Sorbian studies.

Students can earn a B.A. or an M.A. degree in Sorbian studies at Leipzig University. Furthermore, Sorbian language education degrees are available.

== History ==
Initiated by Adolf Černý, Sorbian literature is taught at Charles University in Prague since the 19th century. Since 1933, there is a chair for Sorbian literature, first held by Josef Páta. In 1842, Jan Pětr Jordan, a Sorbian linguist, became lecturer of Slavistics with a special focus on Sorbian in Leipzig.

The history of institutionalized Sorbian studies began in the 1950s with the creation of the Sorbian Ethnological Institute in Bautzen and the Institute for Sorbian Studies in Leipzig.

Unlike students of most minor academic disciplines, Sorbian studies graduates are sought after in Lusatia, as the states of Saxony and Brandenburg guarantee that classes in Sorbian language are available.

== Notable people ==
- Adolf Černý (1864–1952) from Czechia
- Jan Arnošt Smoler (1816–1884) from Germany
- Heinz Schuster-Šewc (1927–2021) from Germany
- Edward Wornar (born 1966) from Germany
