= Sorbian Institute =

Archive organization in Bautzen, Germany

Coordinates: 51°10′31.5″N 14°25′44.3″E

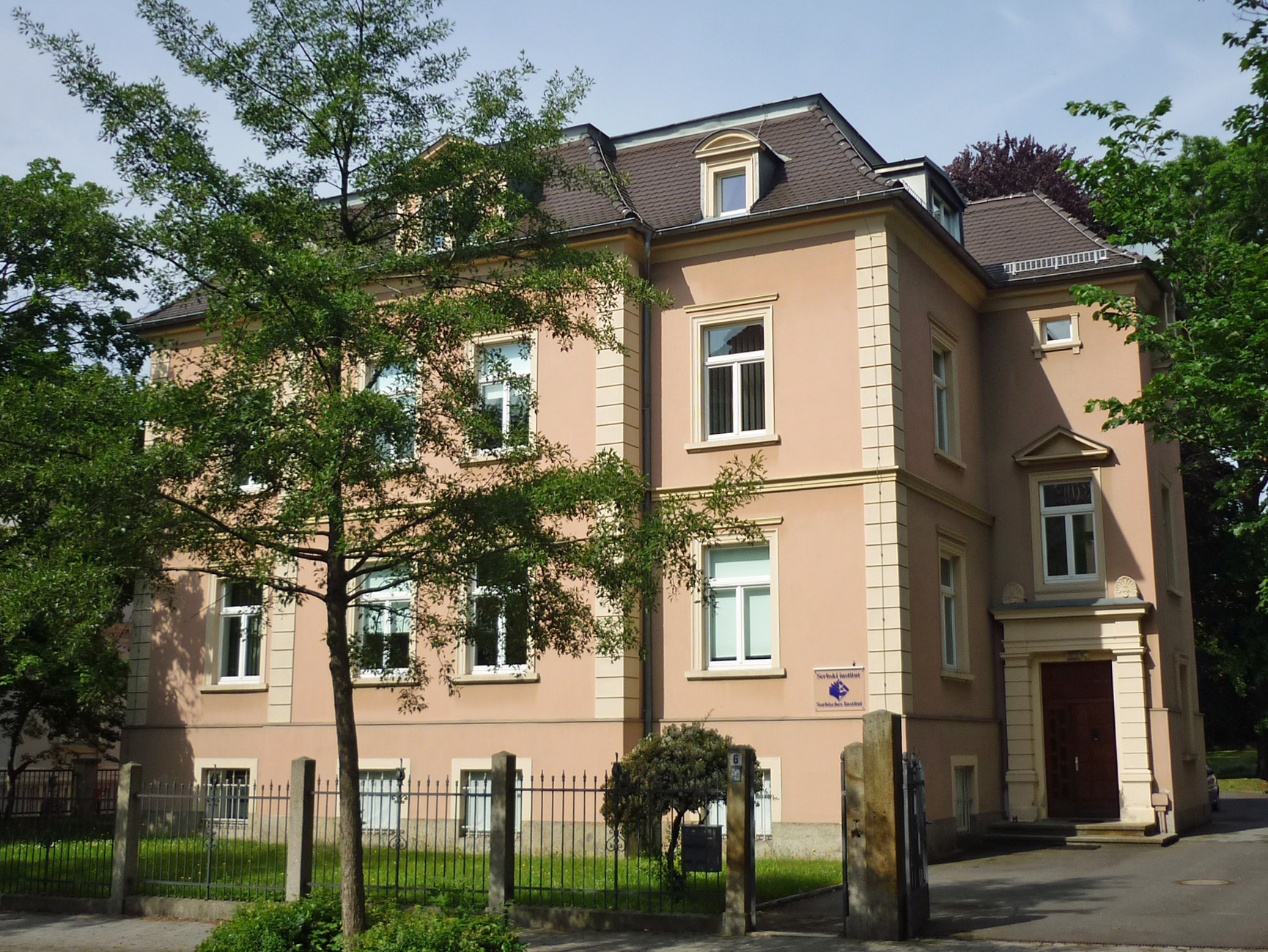
Seat of the Sorbian Institute in Bautzen

The Sorbian Institute (German: Sorbisches Institut; Sorbian: Serbski institut, Upper Sorbian: [ˈsɛʁpskʲi instʲiˈtut], Lower Sorbian: [ˈsɛrpskʲi instʲiˈtut]) is a research facility focused on Sorbian languages, culture and history. It is an extra-university institute collecting and archiving Sorbian texts and cultural artifacts making them available to the public. Originally founded as Institute for Sorbian Ethnology (Institut für sorbische Volksforschung; Institut za serbski ludospyt) by Pawoł Nowotny in 1951, it was then integrated into the German Academy of Sciences at Berlin in 1952. In 1992, the Sorbian institute was established by a treaty of the two German states Brandenburg and Saxony.

== The Institute ==
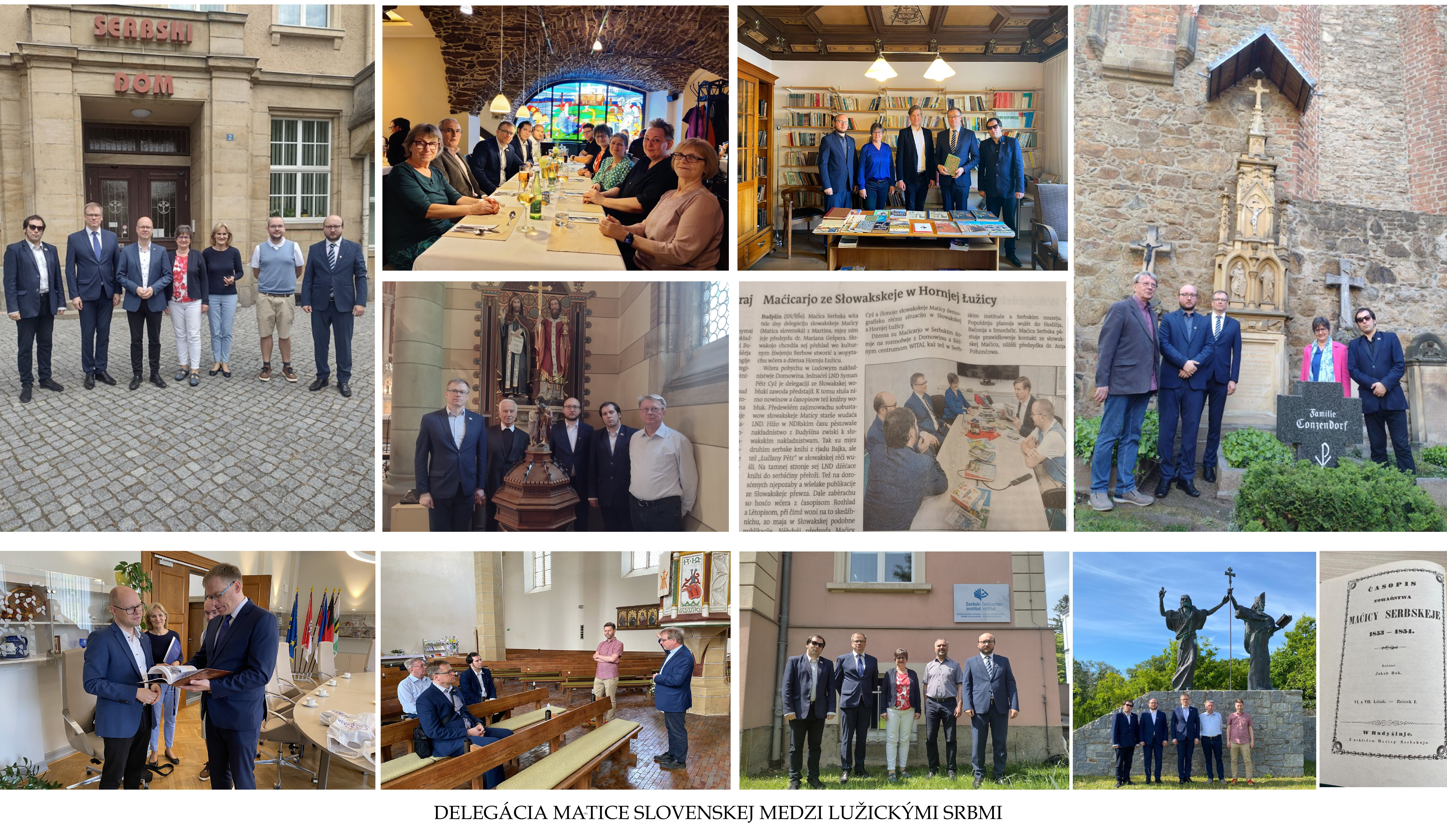
Delegation of Slovak Matica on an official cultural visit to Lusatian-Serbian Matica (Die Maćica Serbska), Domowina, Sorbian Institute (Serbski Institut) and Serbski Dom

The Sorbian Institute's main office is located in Bautzen (Budyšin), with a branch office in Cottbus (Chóśebuz). A new office building to be shared with the Sorbian museum is planned at present in Bautzen. The institute is financially supported by the Foundation for the Sorbian People.

The institute edits the academic journal Lětopis since 1952 and two further book series. The "Schriften des Sorbischen Instituts/Spisy Serbskeho instituta" ('Publications of the Sorbian Institute') are published by Domowina Publishing House.

Its staff often take on teaching assignments at universities both in Germany and abroad. The Sorbian Institute works closely together with the Institute for Sorbian studies at Leipzig University.

It maintains the publicly usable Central Sorbian Library (Sorbische Zentralbibliothek; Serbska centralna biblioteka) and the Sorbian Cultural Archives (Sorbisches Kulturarchiv; Serbski kulturny archiw), both accommodated in its Bautzen main office.

== Executives ==
Since its founding, the executives of the Sorbian Institute were:

- 1951–1977: Pawoł Nowotny
- 1977–1990: Měrćin Kasper (Martin Kasper; vice director: Frank Förster)
- 1990–1992: Helmut Faska
- 1992–2016: Dietrich Scholze-Šołta
- 2016–present: Hauke Bartels
