= Upper Sorbian language =

West Slavic language of eastern Germany

Upper Sorbian
- hornjoserbšćina, hornjoserbsce
- Pronunciation: [ˈhɔʁnʲɔˌsɛʁpʃtʃina]
- Native to: Germany
- Region: Saxony
- Ethnicity: Sorbs
- Native speakers: 25,000 (2025)https://minorityrights.org/communities/sorbs/
- Language family: Indo-European: Balto-Slavic; Slavic; West Slavic; Sorbian; Upper Sorbian
- Writing system: Latin (Sorbian alphabet)

Official status
- Official language in: Regional language in Saxony
- Regulated by: Upper Sorbian Language Commission (Hornjoserbska rěčna komisija)

Language codes
- ISO 639-2: hsb
- ISO 639-3: hsb
- Glottolog: uppe1395
- ELP: Upper Sorbian
- Linguasphere: 53-AAA-bb < 53-AAA-b < 53-AAA-b...-d (varieties: 53-AAA-bba to 53-AAA-bbf)
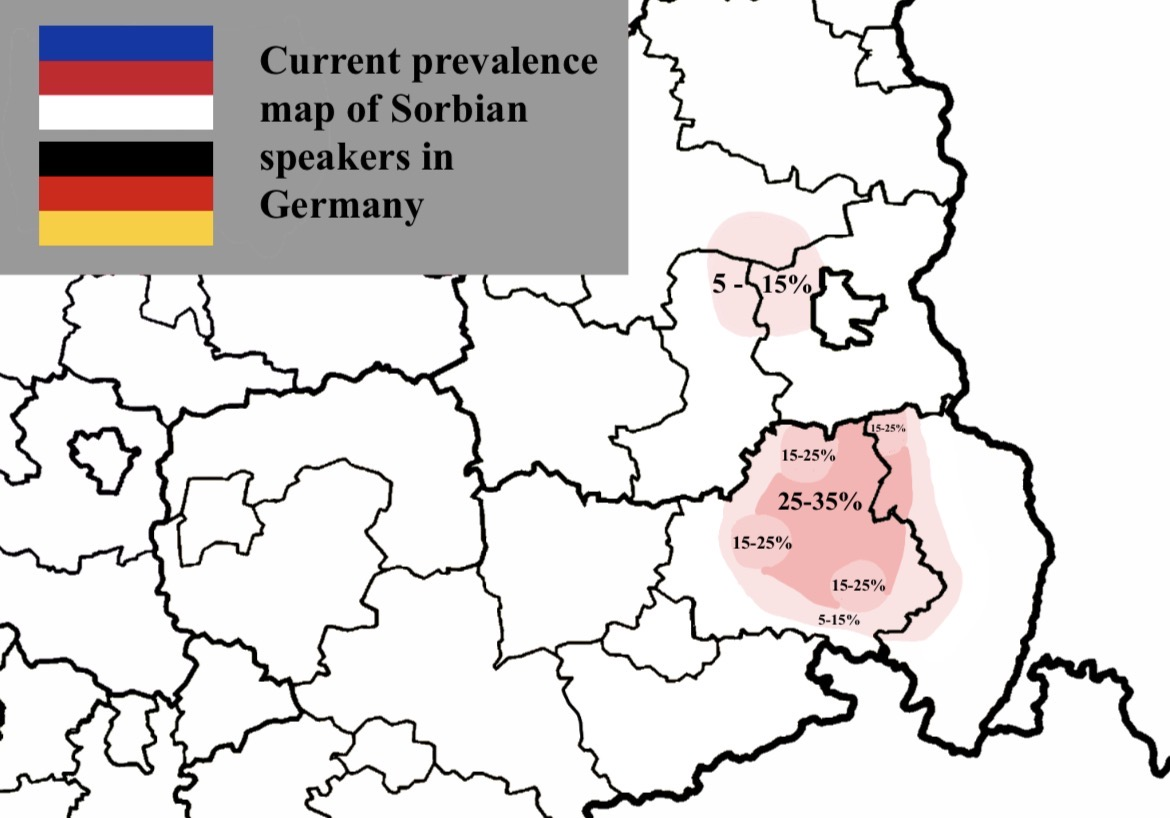
- Current prevalence map of Sorbian speakers in Germany

Upper Sorbian (endonym: hornjoserbšćina), occasionally referred to as Wendish (German: Wendisch), is a minority language spoken by Sorbs in the historical province of Upper Lusatia, today part of Saxony, Germany. It is a West Slavic language, along with Lower Sorbian, Czech, Polish, Silesian, Slovak, and Kashubian. It is now spoken by fewer than 10,000 people, mostly in Budyšin and its immediate countryside.

Upper Sorbian differs from its closest relative, Lower Sorbian (with which it forms the Sorbian subgroup), at all levels of the language system: in phonetics, morphology, and vocabulary. At the same time, the two languages share a number of features that distinguish them from other West Slavic languages—in particular, the preservation of the dual number, the retention of simple past tense forms of verbs, and an especially large number of lexical borrowings from German. Several linguistic features link Upper Sorbian with the Lechitic languages, while in a number of other features it is similar to the Czech-Slovak subgroup.

At present, in addition to everyday use (in dialectal or colloquial form), Upper Sorbian is used as a literary language in education, the mass media, science, and so on. Compared to Lower Sorbian, it has a larger number of speakers, a stricter literary norm, and greater stylistic differentiation. Nevertheless, the number of Upper Sorbian speakers is constantly declining, with the main speakers of the language generally being older members of the Sorbian community, whose main means of communication is not the literary language but dialects (which are best preserved in the areas of Upper Lusatia with a Catholic population). The writing system is based on the Latin alphabet; the earliest written records in Upper Sorbian date back to the 16th century.

Upper Sorbian is one of the minority languages in Germany that are officially recognized under the European Charter for Regional or Minority Languages. In the officially designated settlement area in Upper Lusatia, there are therefore, on the basis of the Saxon Sorbs Act, among other things, bilingual street and place name signs as well as state schools with Upper Sorbian as the language of instruction or Sorbian as a foreign language.

== History ==
The history of the Upper Sorbian language in Germany began with the Slavic migrations during the 6th century AD. Beginning in the 12th century, there was a massive influx of rural Germanic settlers from Flanders, Saxony, Thuringia and Franconia. This so-called "Ostsiedlung" (eastern settlement or expansion) led to a slow but steady decline in use of the Sorbian language. In addition, in the Saxony region, the Sorbian language was legally subordinated to the German language. Language prohibitions were later added: In 1293, the Sorbian language was forbidden in Berne castle before the courts; in 1327 it was forbidden in Zwickau and Leipzig, and from 1424 on it was forbidden in Meissen. Further, there was the condition in many guilds of the cities of the area to accept only members of German-language origin.

However, the central areas of the Milzener and Lusitzer, in the area of today's Lusatia, were relatively unaffected by the new German language settlements and legal restrictions. The language therefore flourished there. By the 17th century, the number of Sorbian speakers in that area grew to over 300,000. The oldest evidence of written Upper Sorbian is the Burger Eydt Wendisch document, which was discovered in the city of Bautzen and dates to the year 1532.

== Linguistic geography ==
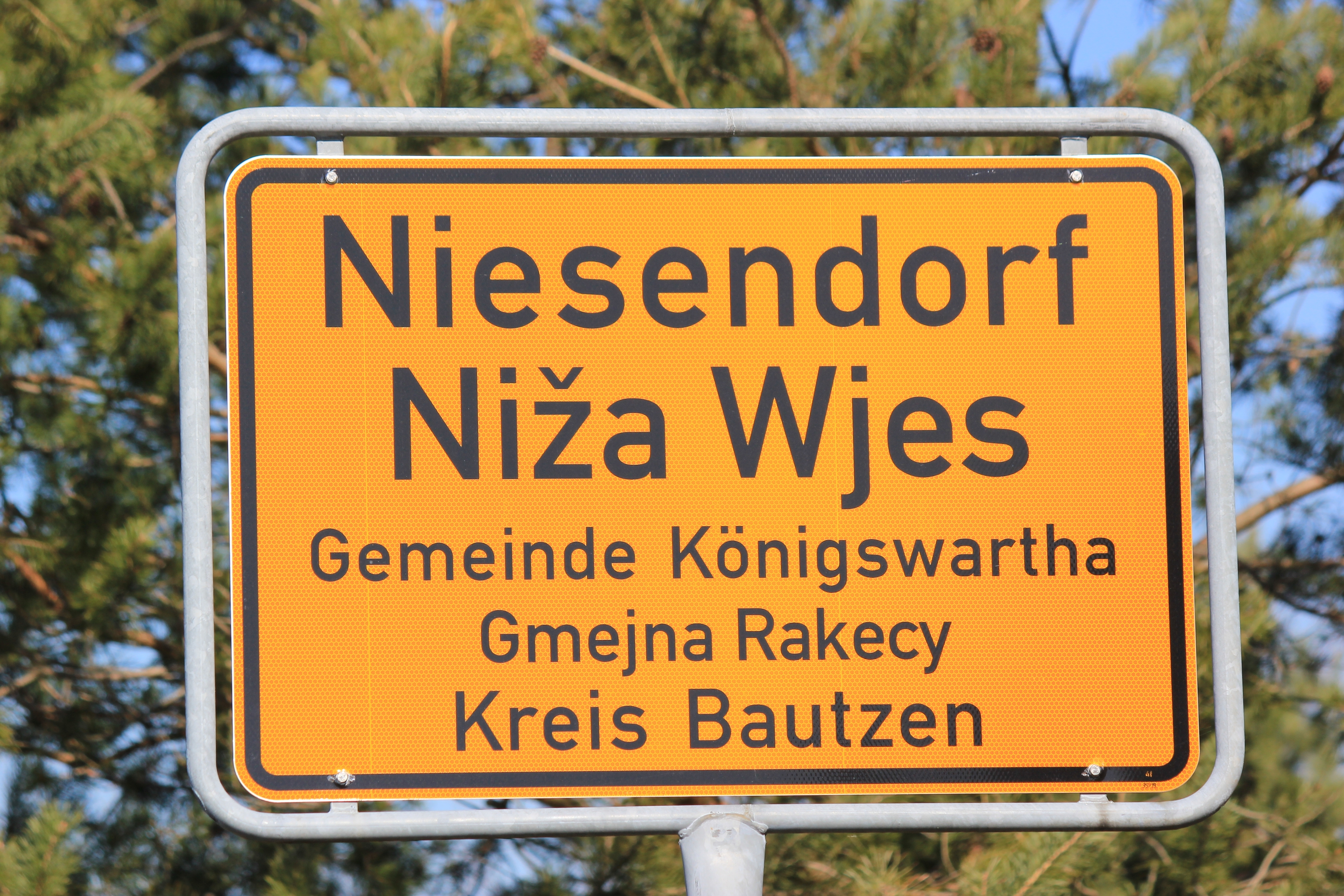
A bilingual sign in Germany; German in first place and Upper Sorbian in second

There are an estimated 18,000 speakers of Upper Sorbian. Almost all of these live in the state of Saxony, chiefly in the district of Bautzen (Budyšin). The stronghold of the language is the village of Crostwitz (Chrósćicy) and the surrounding municipalities, especially to the west of it. In this core area, Upper Sorbian remains the predominant vernacular. In this area, Sorbian is an official language and children are taught Sorbian in schools and day cares. Other concerted efforts to preserve the language through media, club, and related resources have continued into the 21st century. In spite of these efforts, numbers of Upper Sorbian speakers were still considered to be dwindling. It has been suggested that this may be in part because of a lack of understanding of the benefits of bilingualism.

=== Sociolinguistic information ===
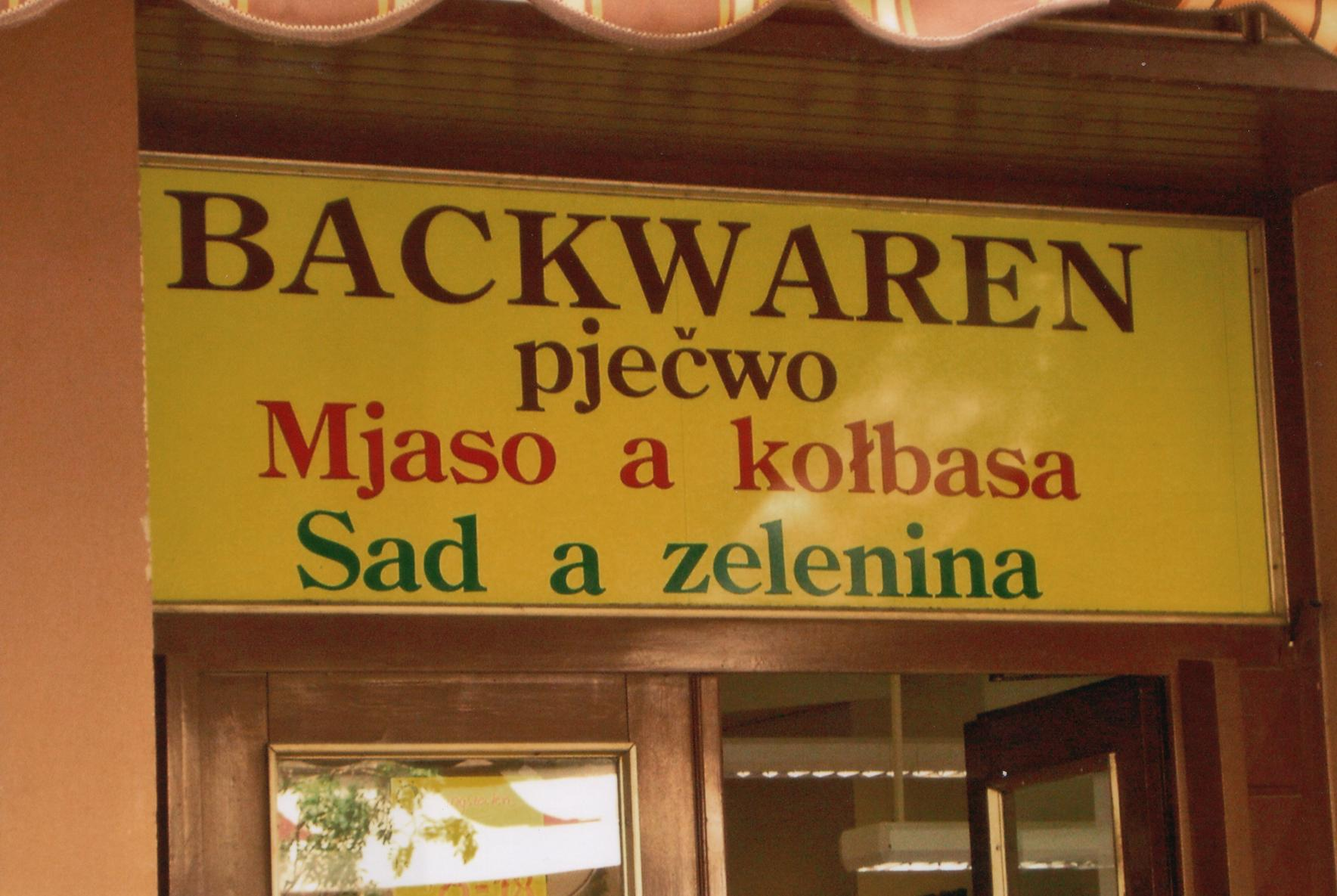
Bilingual sign at a shop on Karl-Marx-Straße in Bautzen, reading: “Bakery products. Meat and sausage. Fruits and vegetables” in Upper Sorbian

The language situation in modern Upper Lusatia is characterized by complete German–Sorbian bilingualism, with a growing tendency toward German monolingualism. The domain of Upper Sorbian, unlike that of German, is significantly limited. German is practically the universal means of communication for all Sorbs, while Upper Sorbian (in dialectal or colloquial form) is used mainly in everyday communication—in the family, with friends and acquaintances; the literary form of Upper Sorbian is used in public life mainly in Sorbian organizations and in the church.

The functions of Upper Sorbian also include Sorbian or bilingual groups in kindergartens, teaching of some subjects in schools providing special education as provided for by Saxony state law, the periodic press and publishing, and use in certain fields of art, culture, and science supported by the Foundation for the Sorbian People, which is funded by the federal government of Germany and the governments of Saxony and Brandenburg. At the same time, due to the small number of pupils, Sorbian schools are under threat of closure; language development is hindered by the administrative fragmentation of Sorbian-inhabited areas, the mass outmigration of young people (which began in the 1990s) to western Germany, the industrial development of the region, and the expansion of brown coal mining, which forces Sorbs to relocate and disrupts the compactness of their settlement area. The low prestige of Sorbian, the existence of mixed Sorbian–German marriages, and the dominant role of German in all areas of life in Upper Lusatia contribute to the constant decline in the number of Upper Sorbian speakers.

Upper Sorbian exists in several forms: the supraregional form, which includes the literary written and spoken varieties as well as the colloquial form (there is also a written form of colloquial speech); and the regional form, represented by Upper Sorbian dialects. A distinctive feature of the relationship between the different forms is the relatively large gap between the literary language and the developing dialectal koine, which influences the colloquial form of Upper Sorbian.

The use of Upper Sorbian varies in different regions of Upper Lusatia, particularly between Catholic and Protestant (Lutheran) areas.

Among Catholics in the far west of the Upper Sorbian-speaking area, natural language transmission (initially at the dialect level) from the older and middle generations to the younger generation is preserved. In Catholic communities located in the triangle Bautzen–Hoyerswerda–Kamenz, 60–65% of the population speak Upper Sorbian, and in some places this figure reaches 80–90%. Members of the younger generation here typically have equally good command of both Upper Sorbian and German; the German population may understand Sorbian passively or even speak it actively. In the Catholic church, services are conducted in Upper Sorbian; in some schools, teaching is carried out in Upper Sorbian, while in others it is taught as a subject. These areas are characterized by more active use of the literary language (both written and spoken), due to the concentration of scientific and cultural Sorbian organizations. In everyday communication, speakers from this dialect area often use a colloquial form of the language that ranges from strongly dialectal to semi-literary with dialectal coloring. The language situation in Catholic communities is somewhat similar to that in Bautzen, the cultural center of the Sorbs.

For most other Upper Sorbian speakers, natural language transmission from the older generation has been broken; members of the middle and younger generations have learned their native language in its literary form only at school. Sorbs here are a minority compared to the German population, and German is the main language of communication; Germans generally do not speak Sorbian. The use of Upper Sorbian in public life is limited; in schools, it is taught as a special elective subject. The role of the literary language compared to dialects is very low. The language situation among Sorbs in the Protestant areas of Upper Lusatia is largely similar to that observed in Lower Lusatia.

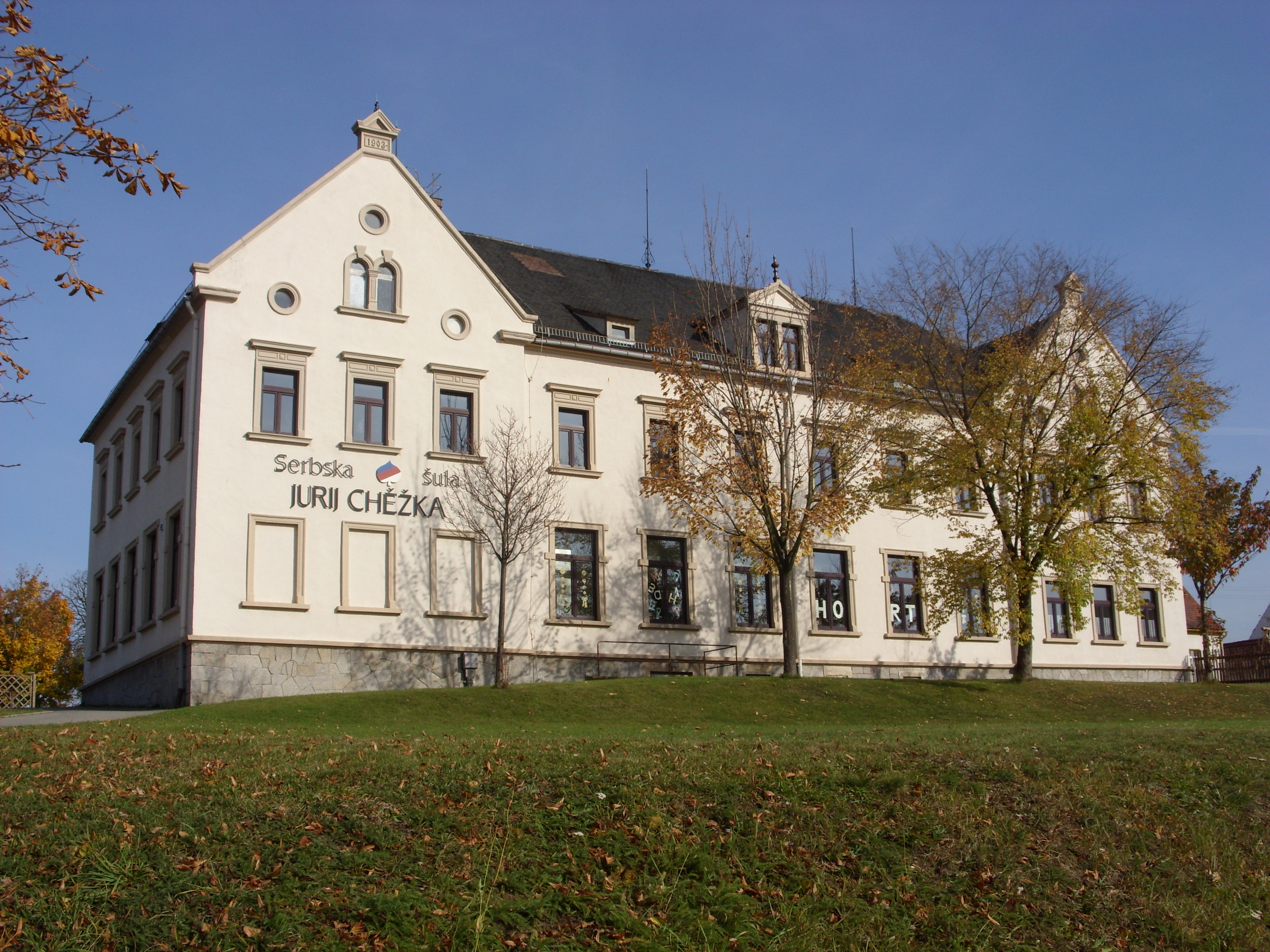
Sorbian school Jurij Chěžka in Crostwitz/Chrósćicy, Bautzen district, Upper Lusatia.

As of 2009, there were 12 Sorbian kindergartens in Saxony, three of them following the Witaj program; in addition, 11 kindergartens had Witaj program groups. Sorbian schoolchildren attended six Sorbian and three bilingual primary schools, four Sorbian and one bilingual secondary school; in the 2009/2010 school year there were 2,232 Sorbian pupils. Bautzen also has a Sorbian gymnasium, and in two other gymnasiums Upper Sorbian is taught as a subject. Upper Sorbian is taught at the Institute for Sorbian Studies at Leipzig University.

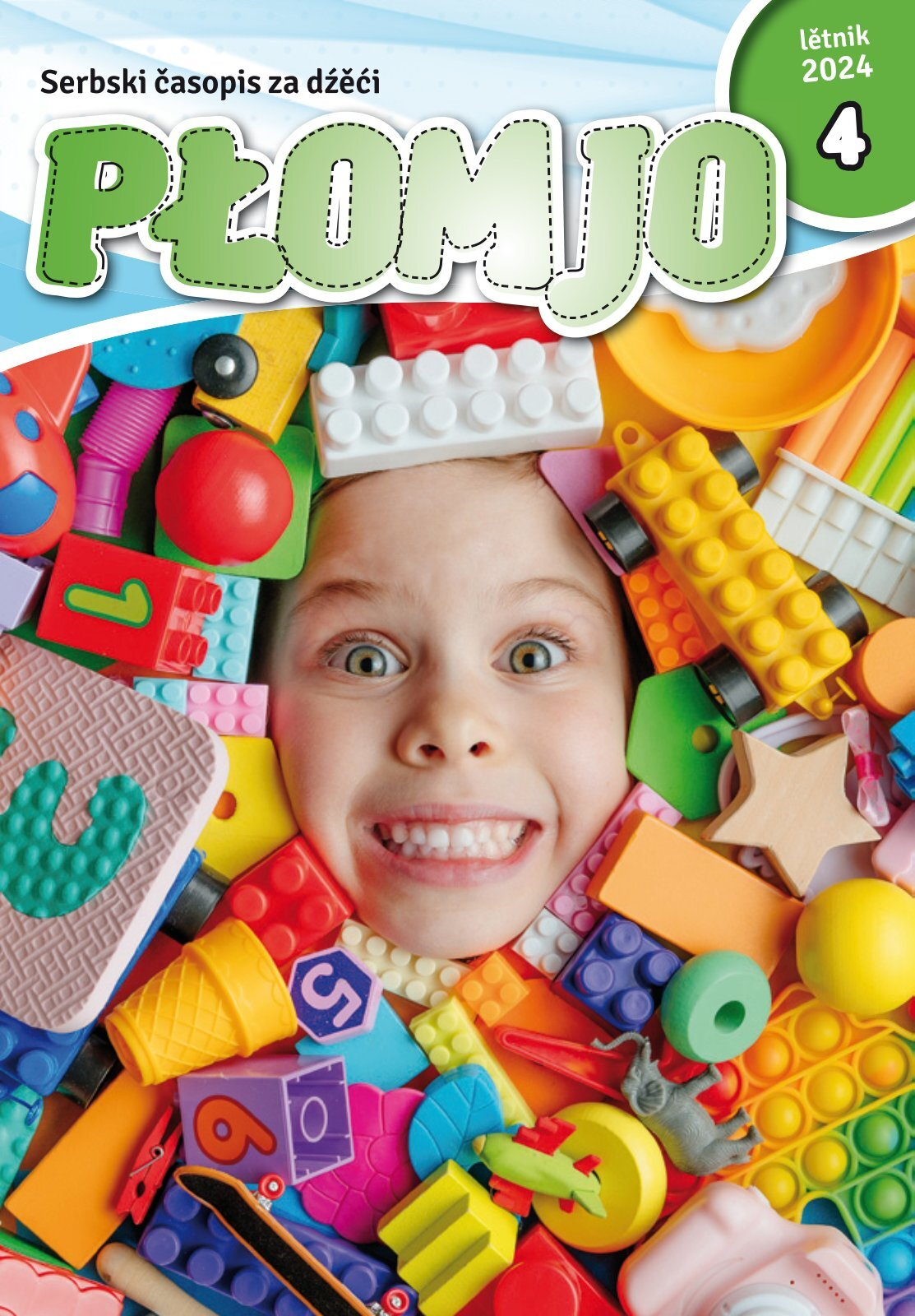
Cover of Płomjo (2024)

Upper Sorbian-language periodicals include the newspaper Serbske Nowiny, the cultural monthly Rozhlad (also with Lower Sorbian materials), the children's magazine Płomjo, and religious publications—the Catholic Katolski Posoł and the Lutheran Pomhaj Bóh. Radio programs are broadcast by Mitteldeutscher Rundfunk (MDR). As of 2017, MDR produces 21.5 hours of radio programming per week. MDR also produces a half-hour Upper Sorbian television program Wuhladko. There are also online publications, such as Runjewonline.info (available in both Sorbian languages).

The preservation and development of Sorbian language and culture is overseen by Domowina—a union of scientific, cultural, religious, student, and other Sorbian organizations. Domowina also operates a publishing house producing books in the Sorbian languages. The current regulator of the literary language is the Upper Sorbian Language Commission (Hornjoserbska rěčna komisija, HRK).

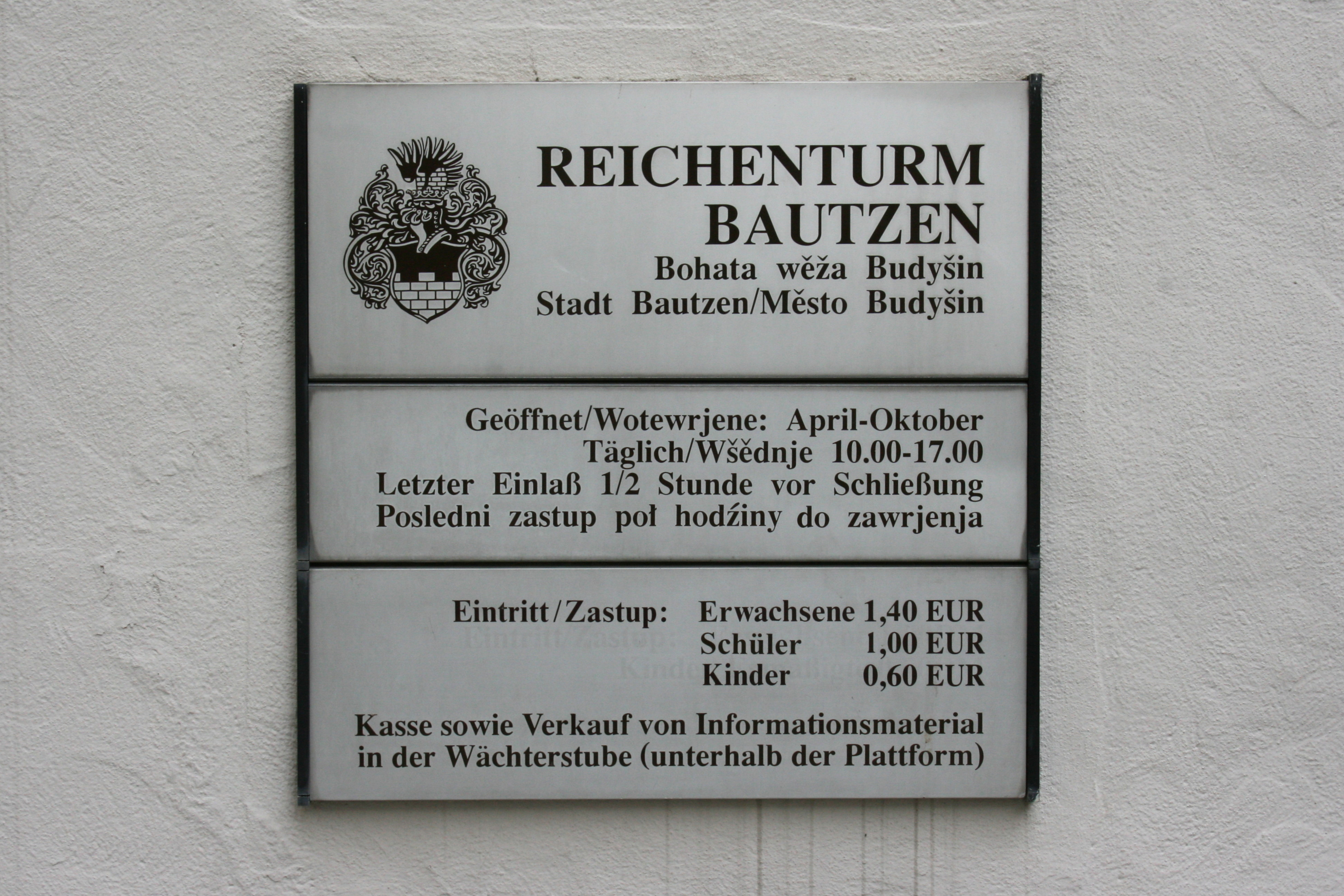
Bilingual sign on the Reichenturm in Bautzen

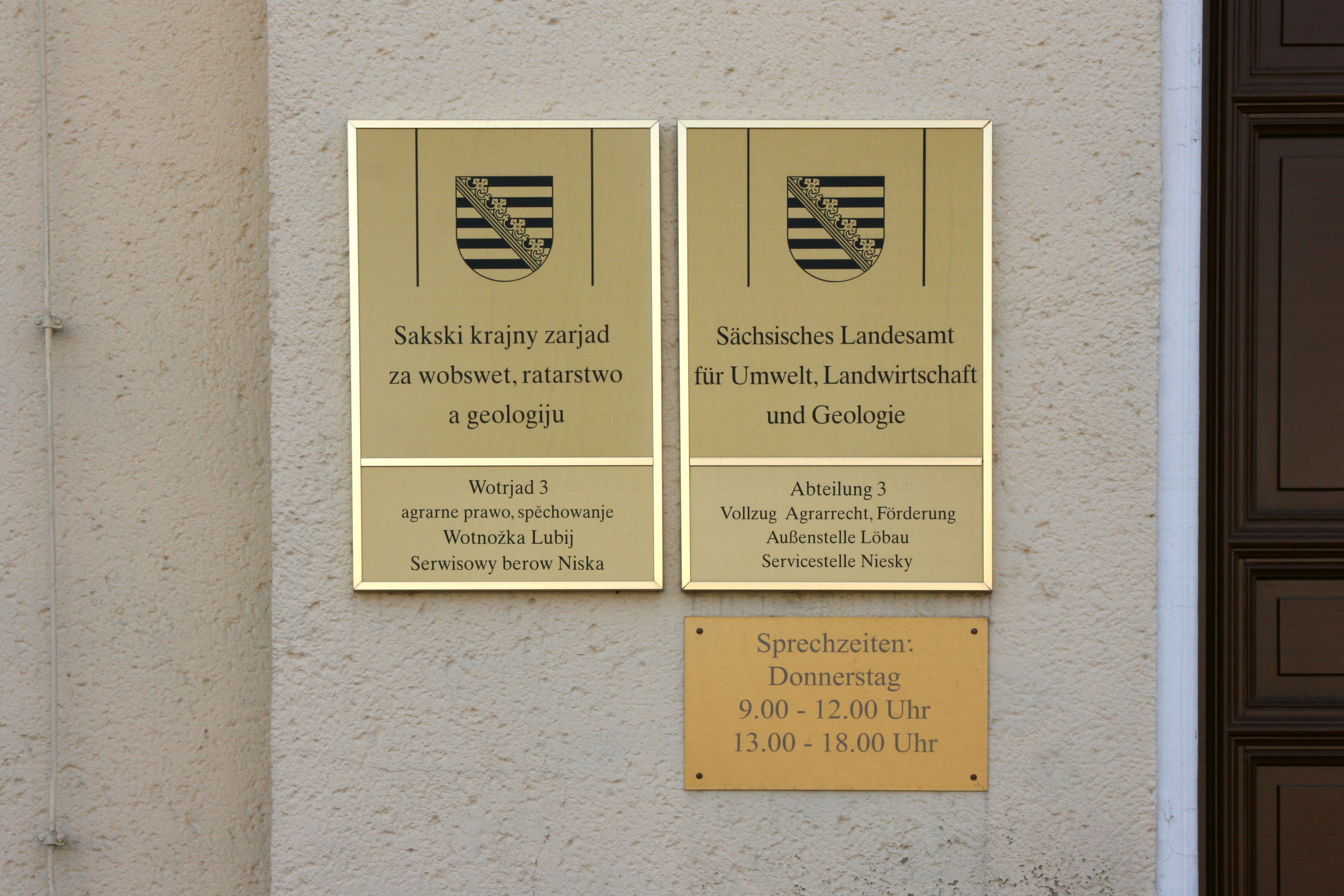
Bilingual signboard on one of the government institutions in Niesky

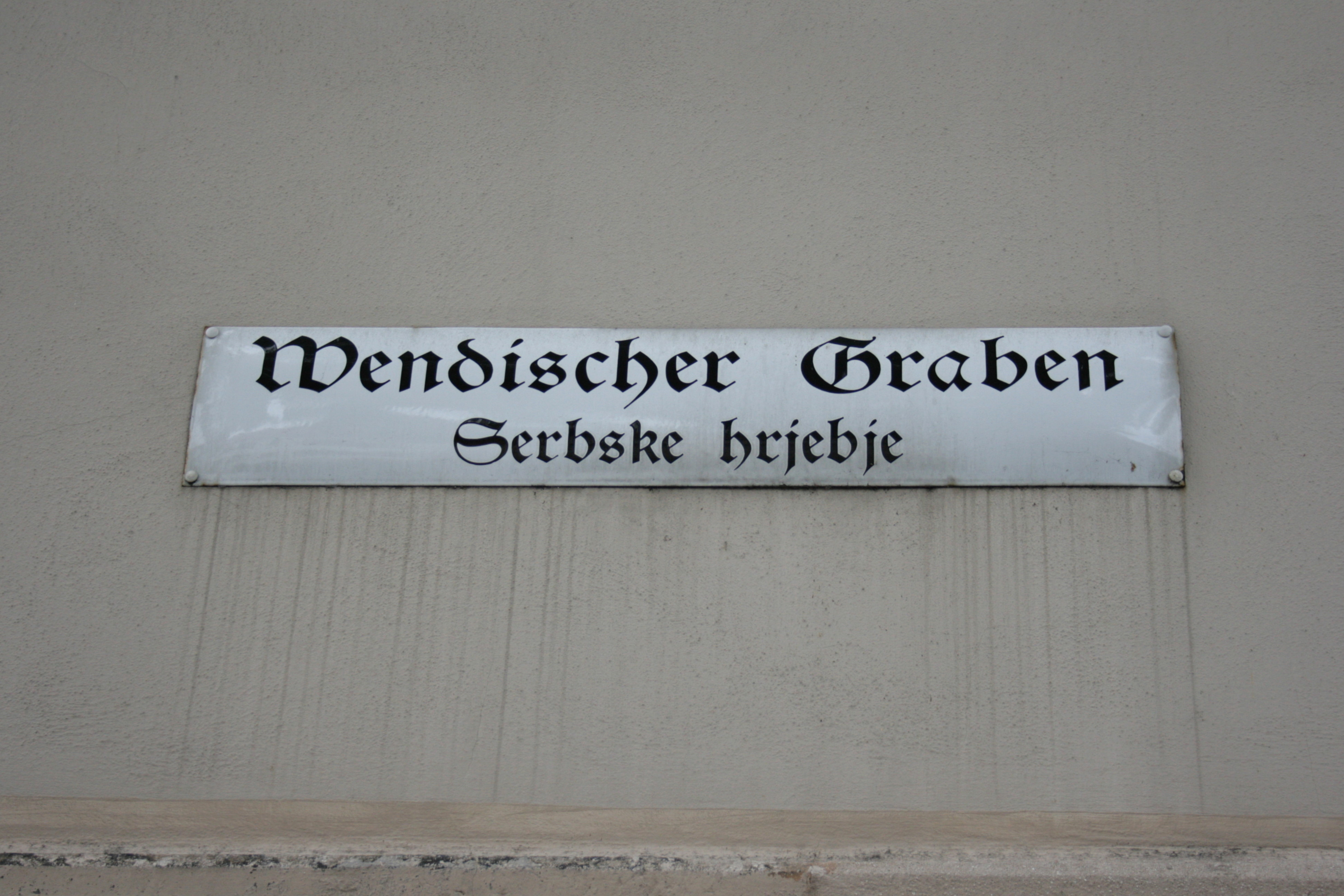
Bilingual street sign in Bautzen

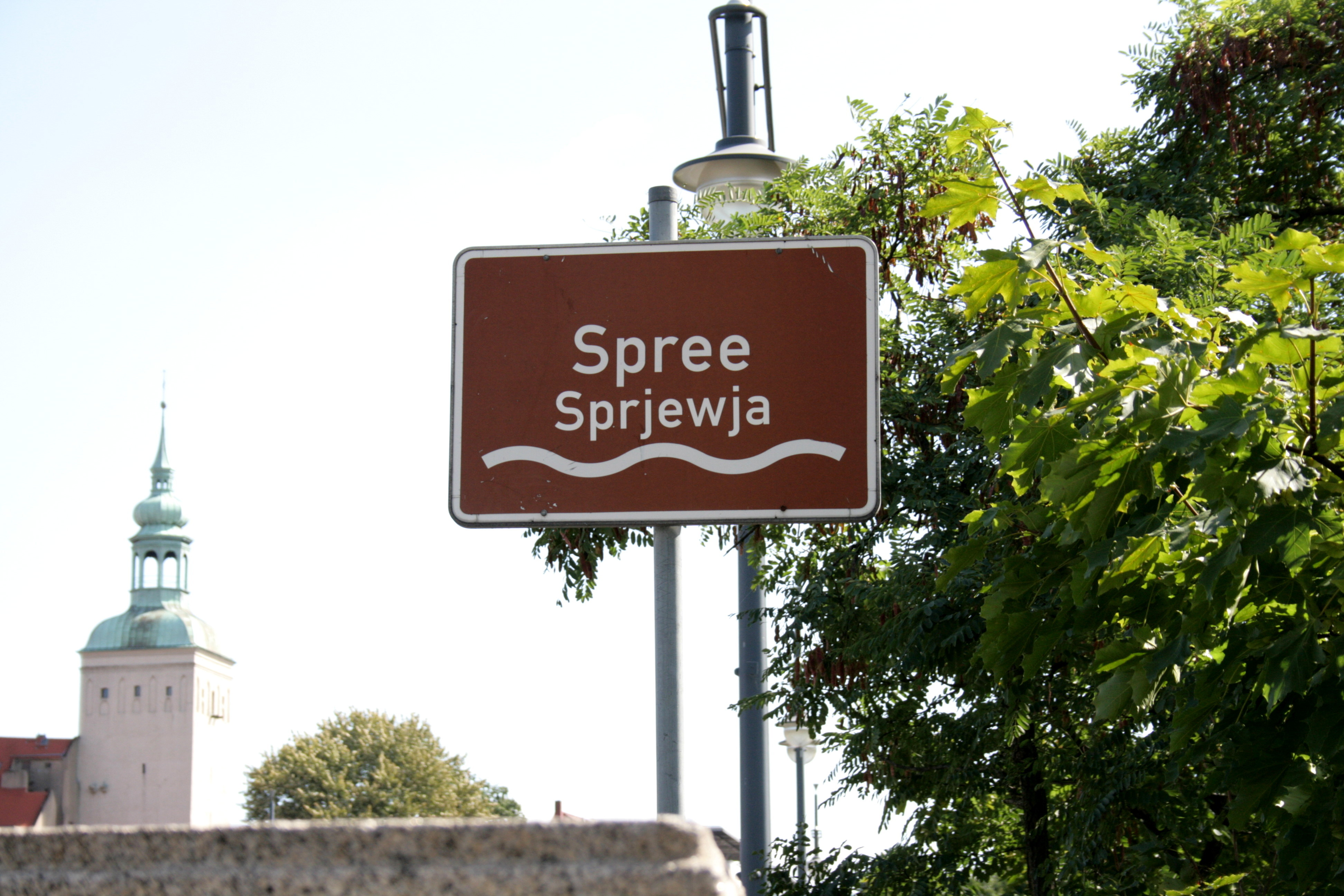
Bilingual name of the river Spree on the bridge in Bautzen

=== Dialect ===
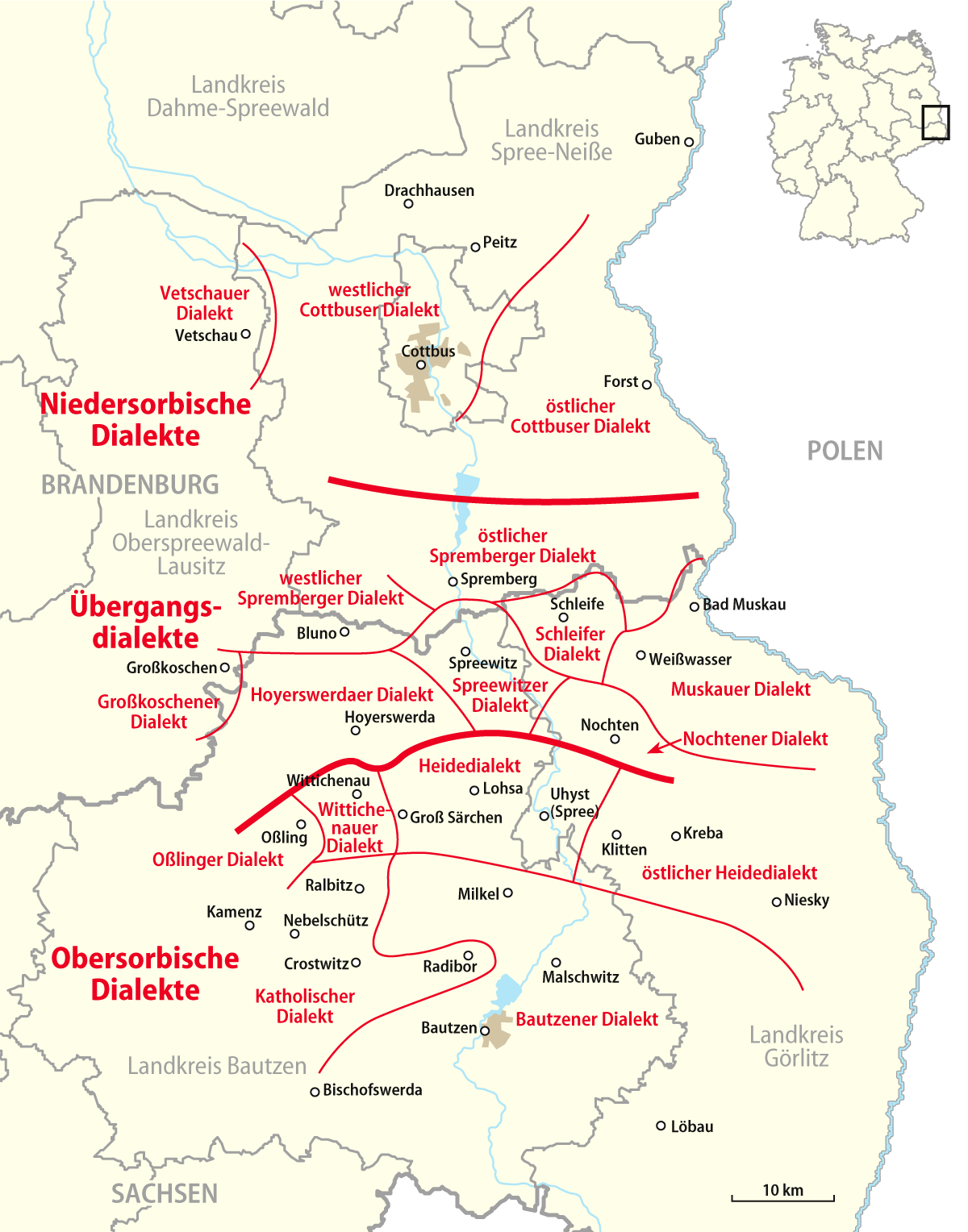
Map of the Sorbian dialects

For most speakers of the Sorbian languages—primarily rural residents—dialects are the main means of communication. Only a relatively small portion of the Sorbian population, mainly the rural and urban intelligentsia, speak the literary languages, including literary Upper Sorbian. In the peripheral areas of the Sorbian language territory, dialects are disappearing relatively quickly (except in the Catholic areas of Upper Lusatia), while in the central regions they are better preserved. Overall, the dialects have been more heavily influenced by the German language compared to the literary Upper Sorbian language.

In Upper Lusatia, the Upper Sorbian group of dialects is spoken; the modern literary Upper Sorbian language developed on the basis of several of these dialects. The area of this dialect group is located in the southern part of the Sorbian-speaking territory and contrasts with the Lower Sorbian dialect area in the north. Upper Sorbian dialects are separated from Lower Sorbian dialects by a zone of transitional (border) dialects, through which broad bundles of isoglosses of major Sorbian linguistic features pass.

Despite covering a relatively small area, the Upper Sorbian territory is characterized by considerable dialectal diversity. The following main dialects are distinguished:

Western dialects, including:

- Kulow dialect (Kulowska narěč, German Wittichenauer Dialekt).
- Catholic dialect (Katolska narěč, German Katholischer Dialekt).

Central dialects, including:

- Bautzen dialect (Budyska narěč, German Bautzener Dialekt).
- Golan dialect (Holanska narěč, German Heidedialekt).

Eastern dialects, including:

- Eastern Golan dialect (Wuchodna holanska narěč, German Östlicher Heidedialekt).

According to the Sorbian Linguistic Atlas, there is also the Lubij or Löbau dialect, among others.

The Bautzen dialect, which formed the basis of the literary language, is spoken in the area surrounding the town of Bautzen. The Catholic dialect is spoken in Catholic parishes west of Bautzen up to the town of Kamenz. The Kulow dialect, closely related to the Catholic dialect, is spoken by Sorbs in the vicinity of Kulow (Wittichenau). To the north and northeast of the Bautzen dialect area lie the regions where the Golan and Eastern Golan dialects are spoken.

== Writing system ==
The Sorbs use the Latin alphabet, supplemented with letters created by means of the diacritical marks ˇ (hóčka) and ´ (smužka).

Following the orthographic reform of December 1, 1948, the Upper Sorbian alphabet contains 34 letters. The letters Qq, Vv, and Xx are used only in foreign proper names. The orthography follows an etymological–phonetic principle.

Letter	a	b	c	č	ć	d	dź	e	ě	f	g	h	ch	i	j	k	ł	l
Name	a	bei̯	ʦei̯	ʧei̯	ʨɛt	dei̯	ʥei̯ / ʥɛt	ei̯	ʲɨt	ɛf	ɡei̯	ha	xa / kʰa	i	i̯ɔt / i̯ʊt	ka	ɛu̯	ɛl

Letter	m	n	ń	o	ó	p	r	ř	s	š	t	u	w	y	z	ž
Name	ɛm	ɛn	eʲn	ɔ	ʊ	pei̯	ɛʀ	ɛʃ	ɛs	ɛʃ	tei̯	u	u̯ei̯	ɨ / ɨpsilɔn	zɛt	ʒɛt

When alphabetically sorting, no distinction is made between the letters n and ń or between o and ó. For example, nósk (“little nose”) is sorted before nosorohač (“rhinoceros”). If two words differ only in these letters, their alphabetical order is still taken into account, as in won (“out, away”) – wón (“he”) – wóń (“scent”).

The letters Ě, Ń, Ó, and Ř never occur at the beginning of a word; therefore, their uppercase forms are very rare and are only used when the entire word is written in uppercase (for example, RÓŽEŃ = “grill rack; spit”).

== Phonology ==
=== Vowels ===
The vowel inventory of Upper Sorbian is exactly the same as that of Lower Sorbian.

Vowel phonemes
	Front	Central	Back
Close	i	ɨ	u
Near-close	ɪ		ʊ
Mid	ɛ		ɔ
Open		a	

- Word-initial vowels are rare, and are often preceded by a non-phonemic glottal stop [ʔ], or sometimes [h]. /i, u, ɛ, ɔ/ appear in word-initial position only in recent borrowings, whereas the diphthongs never occur in this position.
- The near-close /ɪ, ʊ/ can also be analyzed as diphthongs /iɪ, uʊ/. Here, they are analyzed as monophthongs.
- The diphthongal allophones of /ɪ, ʊ/ are falling: [iɪ̯, uʊ̯]. [iɪ] occurs only under strong sentence stress in monosyllabic words. Conversely, [uʊ] is a more common realization of /ʊ/ than [ʊ].
- /ɛ/ has three allophones:
  - Open-mid [ɛ] between hard consonants and after a hard consonant;
  - Mid [ɛ̝] between soft consonants and after a soft consonant (excluding /j/ in both cases);
  - Diphthong with a mid onset [ɛ̝i̯] before /j/.
- /ɔ/ has two allophones:
  - Diphthong with a mid onset [ɔ̝u̯] before labial consonants;
  - Open-mid [ɔ] in all other cases.
- Additional diphthongs arise from r-vocalization, as in German. For instance, uniwersita 'University' may be pronounced [unʲiˈwɛɐ̯sita].
- The distinction between /ɛ, ɔ/ on the one hand and /ɪ, ʊ/ on the other is weakened or lost in unstressed syllables.
- /a/ is phonetically central [ä]. It is somewhat higher [ɐ] after soft consonants.

=== Consonants ===
Consonant phonemes
		Labial		Dental/ Alveolar		Palatal	Velar/ Uvular		Glottal
		hard	soft	hard	soft	soft	hard	soft	hard
Nasal		m	mʲ	n	nʲ				
Plosive	voiceless	p	pʲ	t			k		
Plosive	voiced	b	bʲ	d			ɡ		
Affricate	voiceless			t͡s	(t͡sʲ)	t͡ʃ			
Affricate	voiced			(d͡z)		d͡ʒ			
Fricative	voiceless	f		s		ʃ	x		h
Fricative	voiced	(v)		z	(zʲ)	ʒ	ʁ	ʁʲ	
Approximant		w	wʲ	l		j			

- /m, mʲ, p, pʲ, b, bʲ, w, wʲ/ are bilabial, whereas /f, v/ are labiodental.
  - /mʲ, pʲ, bʲ/ are strongly palatalized.
  - /w/ is a somewhat velarized bilabial approximant [β̞ˠ], whereas /wʲ/ is a strongly palatalized bilabial approximant [ɥ].
  - /v/ is very rare. Apart from loanwords, it occurs only in two Slavonic words: zełharny /ˈzɛvarnɨ/ 'deceitful' and zełharnosć /ˈzɛvarnɔst͡ʃ/ 'deceitfulness', both of which are derivatives of łhać /ˈfat͡ʃ/ 'to lie'. Usage of these words is typically restricted to the Bautzen dialect, as speakers of the Catholic dialect use łžeć /ˈbʒɛt͡ʃ/ and its derivatives.
- /n, l/ are alveolar [n͇, l͇], /nʲ/ is alveolo-palatal [n̠ʲ], whereas /t, d, t͡s, d͡z, t͡sʲ, s, z, zʲ/ are dental [t̪, d̪, t̪͡s̪, d̪͡z̪, t̪͡s̪ʲ, s̪, z̪, z̪ʲ].
  - /t, d, l/ before /i/ (in the case of /l/ also before /ɛ, ɪ/) are weakly palatalized [tʲ, dʲ, lʲ]. Šewc-Schuster (1984) also reports palatalized [fʲ, vʲ, kʲ, ɡʲ, xʲ, hʲ] as allophones of /f, v, k, ɡ, x, h/. Among these, the labiodental [fʲ, vʲ] are extremely rare.
  - /n, nʲ/ are velar [ŋ, ŋʲ] in front of velar consonants.
  - /d͡z/ is very rare. In many cases, it merges with /z/ into [z].
  - /t͡sʲ, zʲ/ are very rare. According to Stone (2002), the phonemic status of /t͡sʲ/ is controversial.
- In most dialects, /t͡ʃ, d͡ʒ, ʃ, ʒ/ are palato-alveolar. This is unlike Lower Sorbian, where these consonants are laminal retroflex (flat postalveolar) [t͡ʂ, ʂ, ʐ] (Lower Sorbian /t͡ʂ/ does not have a voiced counterpart). Laminal retroflex realizations of /ʃ, ʒ/ also occur in Upper Sorbian dialects spoken in some villages north of Hoyerswerda.
- /k, ɡ, x/ are velar, whereas /r, rʲ/ are uvular.
  - An aspirated [kʰ] is a morpheme-initial allophone of /x/ in some cases, as well as a possible word-initial allophone of /k/.
  - /x/ is typically accompanied with trilling of the uvula [ʀ̝̊], so that brach /ˈbrax/ 'fault' is typically pronounced [bʁaʀ̝̊].
  - /x/ does not occur word-initially, whereas /h/ does not occur word-finally.
  - /r, rʲ/ are typically realized as fricatives [ʁ, ʁʲ] or approximants [ʁ̞, ʁ̞ʲ]. They can be trilled [ʀ, ʀʲ] in clear and careful pronunciation. Furthermore, /r/ can also be realized as a voiceless fricative [χ]. It can also be vocalized in the syllable coda, as in uniwersita [unʲiˈwɛɐ̯sita] 'University'. They are never alveolar [r, rʲ], which is an archaic pronunciation.
  - Soft /rʲ/ is strongly palatalized.
- An epenthetic /j/ is inserted before a post-vocalic soft consonant, yielding a diphthong. If the soft consonant occurs before /ɛ/ or /ɪ/, it is often realized as hard, and the vowels merge to [ɛ̝].
- In literary language, the contrast between hard and soft consonants is neutralized in word-final position. For instance, the letter ⟨ń⟩ represents the /jn/ sequence in this position (as in dźeń /ˈd͡ʒɛjn/ 'day'), not a single phoneme /nʲ/.

==== Final devoicing and assimilation ====
Upper Sorbian has both final devoicing and regressive voicing assimilation, both word-internal and across word boundaries. In the latter context, /x/ is voiced to [ɣ]. Regressive voicing assimilation does not occur before sonorants and /h/.

=== Stress ===
- Words consisting of up to three syllables are stressed on the first syllable.
- Foreign words, such as student /stuˈdɛnt/ 'student', preserve their original accent.

=== Prosody ===
Stress in Upper Sorbian is expiratory and falls mainly on the first syllable. In four-syllable or longer words, a secondary stress appears on the penultimate syllable (ˈdźiwaˌdźelnik “actor”). In compound words, the secondary stress falls on the first syllable of the second element (ˈzapadoˌslowjanski “West Slavic”). In the superlative forms of adjectives, the main stress is placed on the prefix naj-, and the secondary stress is on the first syllable of the root (though the reverse placement of stress is also possible). In preposition + noun combinations, the preposition draws the stress onto itself from monosyllabic and disyllabic nouns and pronouns (ˈke mni “to me,” ˈdo města “into the city”), but if the noun carries logical emphasis, it also receives the phonetic stress. Upper Sorbian also has enclitics, i.e., words that cannot bear stress. In loanwords, the stress falls on the same syllable as in the source language (literaˈtura “literature,” šoˈfer “chauffeur”).

== Morphology ==
In Upper Sorbian grammar, the following parts of speech are distinguished: noun, adjective, numeral, pronoun, adverb, verb, conjunction, preposition, particle, and interjection.

Nouns and pronouns in Upper Sorbian have the grammatical categories of gender, number, case, animacy, and person. As in other Slavic languages, masculine, feminine, and neuter genders are distinguished. The category of animacy applies to masculine nouns and the words agreeing with them in the singular. The category of person applies to masculine nouns and their agreeing words in the dual and plural. In the category of number, the archaic dual has been preserved — it also survives in modern Lower Sorbian and Slovene (although in Proto-Slavic the locative dual form coincided with the genitive dual, in Upper Sorbian it has come to coincide with the dative-instrumental dual form).

Nouns and pronouns have six cases: nominative, genitive, dative, accusative, instrumental, and locative, as well as a special vocative form (used for masculine animate nouns, except those ending in -a, and for the feminine noun mać “mother”).

=== Singular ===
In the singular, the declension of nouns (wěcownik, substantiw) of the masculine and neuter genders differs from that of the feminine gender. Before the ending -e in feminine nouns in the dative case, and in nouns of all genders in the locative case, alternations occur between a hard stem consonant and its palatalized counterpart, as well as the following specific alternations: d — dź, t — ć, ł — l, h — z, ch — š, k — c, g — z.

Masculine and neuter nouns in the locative case, if they have a soft or hardened final consonant, as well as in most cases when ending in g, h, ch, k, ł (and some other consonants), take the ending -u instead of -e. In masculine and neuter nouns ending in h, ch, k, when the rare ending -e occurs, the following alternations take place: h — z, ch — š, k — c.

Feminine nouns with stems ending in z, c, s take the ending -y in the dative and locative. Feminine nouns with stems ending in k, g, ch, h take the ending -i in the genitive.

Masculine gender — Examples of declension of masculine nouns: nan (“father”), jež (“hedgehog”), dub (“oak”), and ćerń (“thorn”).

Case	Animate		Inanimate	
Case	Stem ending in hard consonant	Stem ending in soft consonant	Stem ending in hard consonant	Stem ending in soft consonant
Nominative	nan	jěž	dub	ćerń
Genitive	nana	jěža	duba	ćernja
Dative	nanej	jěžej	dubej	ćernjej
Accusative	nana	jěža	dub	ćerń
Instrumental	nanom	jěžom	dubom	ćernjom
Locative	nanje	jěžu	dubje	ćernju

Some monosyllabic inanimate nouns in the genitive case can have, along with the ending -a, also the ending -u: hroda/hrodu (“of the fortress”, “of the castle”), doma/domu (“of the house”), loda/lodu (“of the ice”), mjeda/mjedu (“of the honey”), and so on. In the dative case in some nouns the ending -u occurs along with -ej: ludu (“to/for the people”), měru (“to/for the world/peace”), wozu (“to/for the cart”), and so on, bóh (“God”) ends in the dative case only with -u. In the accusative case the endings of animate nouns coincide with the endings of the genitive case, the endings of inanimate nouns — with the endings of the nominative case. Special paradigms of nouns ending in -a and personal names ending in -o : predsyda (“chairman”), predsydy, predsydźe, predsydu, predsydu, predsydźe; ćěsla (“carpenter”), ćěsle, ćěsli, ćěslu, ćěslu, ćěsli; Beno, Bena, Benej, Bena, Benom, Benje.

- Feminine and neuter gender. Examples of declension of neuter nouns: słowo (“word”), morjo (“sea”), ranje (“morning”), and feminine gender: žona (“woman”, “wife”), kólnja (“shed”) and hródź (“cowshed”).

Case	Neuter		Feminine	
Case	Stem on a hard consonant	Stem on a soft consonant	Stem on a hard consonant	Stem on a soft consonant
Nominative	słowo	morjo, ranje	žona	kólnja, hródź
Genitive	słowa	morja	žony	kólnje, hródźe
Dative	słowu	morju	žonje	kólni, hródźi
Accusative	słowo	morjo, ranje	žonu	kólnju, hródź
Instrumental	słowom	morjom	žonu	kólnju, hródźu
Locative	słowje	morju	žonje	kólni, hródźi

In the nominative and accusative cases the noun knjeni (“lady”) ends in -i, in the other cases it declines like the word kólnja (“shed”, “canopy”). Nouns of the type kuchnja (“kitchen”), bróžnja (“barn”, “shed”) have parallel forms kucheń, bróžeń. Nouns of the type spěwanje (“singing”), drěnje (“pulling”), ranje (“morning”) have the ending -e, in the other cases they decline like the word morjo (“sea”). In the genitive case the forms of the nouns škla (“bowl”, “dish”) and woš (“louse”): šklě and wši. In the dative and locative cases the nouns stwa (“room”) and hra (“game”) have the ending -ě.

Dual number

The endings of masculine nouns in the nominative and accusative cases of the dual number differ from the endings of feminine and neuter nouns. Depending on whether masculine nouns in the accusative case denote a person or not, they have different endings. For nouns denoting paired objects, instead of dual forms, plural forms can be used: nohi instead of noze (“legs”), ruki instead of ruce (“hands”). Before the ending -e in the nominative and accusative cases for feminine and neuter nouns, alternation of a hard consonant of the stem with a soft one occurs, as well as alternations d — dź, t — ć, ł — l, h — z, ch — š, k — c, g — z. After soft consonants in the nominative and accusative cases, alternation a — e occurs. Neuter and feminine nouns with a stem ending in z, c, s in the nominative and accusative cases have the ending -y.

Examples of the declension of masculine nouns: nanaj (“two fathers”), mužej (“two husbands”, “two men”), psykaj (“two dogs”) and ježej (“two hedgehogs”); feminine gender: žonje (“two wives”, “two women”); and neuter gender: mori (“two seas”):

Case	Masculine gender				Non-masculine gender	
Case	Denoting persons		Not denoting persons		Non-masculine gender	
Case	Stem ending in a hard consonant	Stem ending in a soft consonant	Stem ending in a hard consonant	Stem ending in a soft consonant	Stem ending in a hard consonant	Stem ending in a soft consonant
Nominative	nanaj	mužej	psykaj	ježej	žonje	mori
Genitive	nanow	mužow	psykow	ježow	žonow	morjow
Dative	nanomaj	mužomaj	psykomaj	ježomaj	žonomaj	morjomaj
Accusative	nanow	mužow	psykaj	ježej	žonje	mori
Instrumental	nanomaj	mužomaj	psykomaj	ježomaj	žonomaj	morjomaj
Locative	nanomaj	mužomaj	psykomaj	ježomaj	žonomaj	morjomaj

In the nominative and accusative cases, the nouns stwa (“room”) and hra (“game”) have the ending -ě. The nominative and accusative forms of the nouns wucho (“ear”) and woko (“eye”) are: wuši and woči.

Special paradigms of nouns in -a [148]: predsydaj (“both chairmen”), predsydow, predsydomaj, predsydow, predsydomaj, predsydomaj; ćěslej (“both carpenters”), ćěslow, ćěslomaj, ćěslow, ćěslomaj, ćěslomaj.

Plural

Depending on the endings that occur in the nominative and accusative cases of the plural, all nouns are divided into three groups: masculine nouns denoting persons (personal masculine), other masculine nouns and feminine nouns (non-personal masculine), and neuter nouns.

Examples of declension of personal masculine nouns: nanojo (“fathers”), mužojo (“husbands”, “men”); non-personal masculine nouns: duby (“oaks”); and feminine nouns: kólnje (“sheds”, “canopies”); as well as neuter nouns: słowa (“words”) and morja (“seas”):

Case	Masculine and feminine gender				Neuter gender	
Case	Personal masculine nouns		Non-personal masculine nouns		Neuter gender	
Case	Stem ending in a hard consonant	Stem ending in a soft consonant	Stem ending in a hard consonant	Stem ending in a soft consonant	Stem ending in a hard consonant	Stem ending in a soft consonant
Nominative	nanojo	mužojo	duby	kólnje	słowa	morja
Genitive	nanow	mužow	dubow	kólnjow	słowow	morjow
Dative	nanam	mužam	dubam	kólnjam	słowam	morjam
Accusative	nanow	mužow	duby	kólnje	słowa	morja
Instrumental	nanami	mužemi	dubami	kólnjemi	słowami	morjemi
Locative	nanach	mužach	dubach	kólnjach	słowach	morjach

Non-personal masculine nouns of masculine and feminine gender in the nominative and accusative cases with a stem ending in k, g, ch, h have the ending -i. In the instrumental case, after soft consonants, alternation a — e occurs. In the nominative case, nouns denoting a male person mostly end in -ojo. Nouns with the suffixes -ar-, -er-, -el-, -ol-, -an- have the ending -jo (before which in the suffix -an- the alternation a — e occurs). Nouns ending in -c and -k end in -y (with the alternation k — c before this ending). Some nouns have endings -i and -a, before which alternation of a hard stem consonant with a soft one occurs, as well as alternations t — ć, d — dź, ł — l, ch — š and others: bratřa (“brothers”), kmótřa (“godfathers”), susodźa (“neighbors”), husići/husića (“Hussites”), studenći/studenća (“students”), etc. Forms of the nouns škla and woš in the nominative and accusative cases: šklě and wši.

In the genitive case, nouns with a soft stem or with a stem ending in -ł have, alongside the ending -ow, also the ending -i (for the nouns dźěći “children” and ludźi “people” only the ending -i is used); in the nouns husy (“geese”) and kury (“hens”) the ending -y is found alongside -ow. Some nouns have no ending in the genitive case: pjenjez (“money”), Drježdźan (“of Dresden”), and others.

In the dative case, for a number of nouns denoting living beings, alongside the ending -am the ending -om is also found: wołam/wołom (“to oxen”), kruwam/kruwom (“to cows”), husam/husom (“to geese”), etc.; some nouns have only the ending -om: dźěćom (“to children”), ludźom (“to people”), etc.

In the instrumental case, alongside the ending -ami (-emi), the ending -imi (-ymi) is also found: konjemi/konimi (“with horses”), kruwami/kruwymi (“with cows”), etc.; some nouns have only the ending -imi (-ymi): dźěćimi (“with children”), ludźimi (“with people”), etc.

In the locative case, alongside the ending -ach, the ending -och is also found: konjach/konjoch (“on horses”), kruwach/kruwoch (“on cows”), swinjach/swinjoch (“on pigs”), etc.; some nouns have only the ending -och: dźěćoch (“about children”), ludźoch (“about people”), etc.

Special paradigms of nouns ending in -a: predsydojo (“chairmen”), predsydow, predsydam, predsydow, predsydami, predsydach; ćěslojo (“carpenters”), ćěslow, ćěslam, ćěslow, ćěslemi, ćěslach.

Peculiarities of the declension of some nouns.

For nouns denoting young creatures, in the singular and dual numbers, the suffix -eć- is added to the stem (except in the nominative and accusative forms); in the plural — the suffix -at-: ćelo (“calf”), ćeleća (singular), ćeleći (dual), ćelata (plural).

For some nouns with a stem ending in a soft consonant, it is characteristic to add the suffix -en- to the stem (except in the nominative and accusative forms): znamjo (“sign”), znamjenja (singular), znamjeni (dual), znamjenja (plural).

To the stem of the noun mać in all forms except the nominative and accusative, the suffix -er- is added (in the accusative, both mać and maćer are possible).

To the noun dźěćo (“child”), in the singular and dual numbers, the suffix -s- is added to the stem (except in the nominative and accusative forms): dźěćo, dźěsća (singular), dźěsći (dual). The plural paradigm: dźěći, dźěći, dźěćom, dźěći, dźěćimi, dźěćoch.

Adjective

Adjectives (adjektiwy, kajkostniki) are divided into three categories:

- qualitative (kajkostne, kwalitatiwne): stary “old”, młody “young”, wuski “narrow”, šěroki “wide”, wysoki “tall”, niski “low”, němy “mute”, slepy “blind”, žiwy “alive”, mortwy “dead”;
- relative (poćahowe, relaciske), expressing the quality of an object through another object: hórski “mountain”, dobroćiwy “benevolent”, wěriwy “believing”, “trusting”;
- possessive (přiswojace, posesiwne), expressing possession: nanowy “father’s”, “paternal”, maćerny “mother’s”, “maternal”.

Adjectives have two types of declension — soft (which includes adjectives whose stem ends in č, š, ž or soft n and w) and hard (which includes all the rest). A number of adjectives are indeclinable: ryzy (“red-haired”), bosy (“barefoot”), nabruń (“brownish”), načorń (“blackish”), nazeleń (“greenish”), sćicha (“quiet”, “calm”), zhorda (“proud”), zwulka (“arrogant”, “haughty”), and others.

Declension of hard-type adjectives using the example mały “small”:

Case	Singular			Dual	Plural
Case	Masculine	Neuter	Feminine	Dual	Plural
Nominative	mały	małe	mała	małej, małaj	małe, mali
Genitive	małeho	małeho	małeje	małeju	małych
Dative	małemu	małemu	małej	małymaj	małym
Accusative	mały, małeho	małe	mału	małej, małeju	małe, małych
Instrumental	małym	małym	małej	małymaj	małymi
Locative	małym	małym	małej	małymaj	małych

Declension of soft-type adjectives using the example tuni (“cheap”):

Case	Singular			Dual	Plural
Case	Masculine	Neuter	Feminine	Dual	Plural
Nominative	tuni	tunje	tunja	tunjej	tunje, tuni
Genitive	tunjeho	tunjeho	tunjeje	tunjeju	tunich
Dative	tunjemu	tunjemu	tunjej	tunimaj	tunim
Accusative	tuni, tunjeho	tunje	tunju	tunjej, tunjeju	tunje, tunich
Instrumental	tunim	tunim	tunjej	tunimaj	tunimi
Locative	tunim	tunim	tunjej	tunimaj	tunich

In the masculine gender, the form of the accusative singular coincides with the form of the genitive if the adjective agrees with an animate noun. In the dual and plural, the form of the accusative coincides with the genitive if the adjective agrees with a noun denoting a male person. In personally masculine forms of the nominative plural, consonant alternations occur: ch — š, t — ć, d — dź, l — ł before the ending -i; with similar alternations k — c, h — z, this ending itself is replaced with -y: wulki (“big”) → wulcy (“big” plural), nahi (“naked”) → nazy (“naked” plural), etc. In Upper Sorbian, there are no short forms of adjectives.

Forms of the comparative (komparatiw) and superlative (superlatiw) degrees are formed only from relative-qualitative adjectives. The comparative form is made using the suffixes -ši and -iši/-yši (-yši appears after the consonants c, z, s). Some comparative forms are formed suppletively: wulki “big” → wjetši, mały “small” → mjeńši, dobry “good” → lěpši, zły “bad” → hórši, dołhi “long” → dlěši. The superlative form is made by adding the prefix naj- to the comparative form. In addition to the synthetic method of forming degrees of comparison, there is also an analytic one, in which the comparative form is made by adding to the positive form the adverb bóle, and the superlative — najbóle.

Numeral

Upper Sorbian numerals (ličbniki, numerale) are divided into the following categories:

- cardinal (kardinalne, zakładne);
- ordinal (ordinalne, rjadowe);
- collective (kolektiwne) — used with pluralia tantum nouns: jedne, dwoje, troje, štwore, pjećore, šesćore;
- species (diferinciske) — indicating qualitative differentiation: jenaki, dwojaki, trojaki, štworaki, pjećoraki;
- multiplicative (multiplikatiwne): dwójny “double”, trójny “triple”;
- adverbial numerals (numerale wobstejenja): jónu “once”, dwójce “twice”, trójce “thrice”.

Numerals from one to twenty-one:

Cardinal		Personal masculine forms	Ordinal	Collective
	Non-personal masculine forms	Personal masculine forms	Ordinal	Collective
1	jedyn (masc.), jedna (fem.), jedne (neu.)		prěni	
2	dwaj (masc.), dwě (fem., neu.)		druhi	dwoje
3	tři	třo	třeći	troje
4	štyri	štyrjo	štwórty	štwore
5	pjeć	pjećo	pjaty	pjećore
6	šěsć	šěsćo	šěsty	šěsćory
7	sydom	sydmjo	sydmy	sydmore
8	wosom	wosmjo	wosmy	wosmory
9	dźewjeć	dźewjećo	dźewjaty	dźewjećore
10	dźesać	dźesaćo	dźesaty	dźesaćore
11	jědnaće	jědnaćo	jědnaty	jědnaćore
12	dwanaće	dwanaćo	dwanaty	dwanaćore
13	třinaće	třinaćo	třinaty	
14	štyrnaće	štyrnaćo	štyrnaty	
15	pjatnaće	pjatnaćo	pjatnaty	
16	šěsnaće	šěsnaćo	šěsnaty	
17	sydomnaće	sydomnaćo	sydomnaty	
18	wosomnaće	wosomnaćo	wosomnaty	
19	dźewjatnaće	dźewjatnaćo	dźewjatnaty	
20	dwaceći	dwacećo	dwacety	dwacećore
21	jedynadwaceći	jedynadwacećo	jedynadwacety	

Numerals from thirty to a billion:

	Cardinal		Ordinal	Collective
	Non-personal masculine forms	Personal masculine forms	Ordinal	Collective
30	třiceći	třicećo	třicety	
40	štyrceći	štyrcećo	štyrcety	
50	pjećdźesat	pjećdźesaćo	pjećdźesaty	
60	šěsćdźesat	šěsćdźesaćo	šěsćdźesaty	
70	sydomdźesat	sydomdźesaćo	sydomdźesaty	
80	wosomdźesat	wosomdźesaćo	wosomdźesaty	
90	dźewjećdźesat	dźewjećdźesaćo	dźewjećdźesaty	
100	sto		stoty	stotory
101	sto a jedyn		sto a prěni	
200	dwě sćě		dwustoty	
300	tři sta		třistoty	
400	štyri sta		štyristoty	
500	pjeć stow		pjećstoty	
600	šěsć stow		šěsćstoty	
700	sydom stow		sydomstoty	
800	wosom stow		wosomstoty	
900	dźewjeć stow		dźewjećstoty	
1000	tysac		tysacty	tysacore
1 000 000	milion		milionty	
2 000 000	dwaj milionaj		dwumilionty	
1 000 000 000	miliarda		miliardny	

Declension of the numeral “one”:

Case		Singular number			Plural number	
Case		Masculine	Neutral	Feminine	Personal masculine forms	Non-personal masculine forms
Nominative		jedyn	jedne	jedna	jedni	jedne
Genitive		jednoho		jedneje	jednych	
Dative		jednomu		jednej	jednym	
Accusative	inanimate	jedyn	jedne	jednu	jednych	jedne
Accusative	animate	jednoho	jedne	jednu	jednych	jedne
Instrumental		jednym		jednej	jednymi	
Locative		jednym		jednej	jednych	

Under the influence of the German language, in colloquial Upper Sorbian, the numeral jedyn is often used in the function of an indefinite article.

Declension of the numerals two, three, four, five:

Case	Two			Three		Four		Five	
Case	Personally masculine forms	Non-personally masculine forms	Neuter and feminine	Personally masculine forms	Non-personally masculine forms	Personally masculine forms	Non-personally masculine forms	Personally masculine forms	Non-personally masculine forms
Nominative	dwajo	dwaj	dwě	třo	tři	štyrjo	štyri	pjećo	pjeć
Genitive	dwejoch	dweju		třoch		štyrjoch		pjećoch	
Dative	dwejom	dwěmaj		třom		štyrjom		pjećom	
Accusative	dweju (dwejoch)	dweju	dwě	třoch	tři	štyrjoch	štyri	pjećoch	pjeć
Instrumental	dwejomi	dwěmaj		třomi		štyrjomi		pjećomi	
Locative	dwejoch	dwěmaj		třoch		štyrjoch		pjećoch	

The personally masculine forms of the numeral “two”, except for the accusative case form dweju, are colloquial in nature. Numerals from 6 to 99 decline like five. Thousand, million, and billion decline like nouns. Numerals starting from five decline only when used independently; when used in a phrase, they do not decline.

=== Pronoun ===
Pronouns (naměstniki, pronomeny) in Upper Sorbian are divided into the following categories:

- Personal (wosobowe, personalne)
  - Basic (zakładne): ja, mój, my, ty, wój, wy, wón, wona, wono
- Possessive (přiswojowace, posesiwne): mój, naju, naš, twój, waju, waš, jeho, jeje
- Demonstrative (pokazowace, demonstratiwne): tón, tutón, wony, tamny, tamón
- Reflexive (wróćace, refleksiwne)
  - Basic: sebje/so
  - Possessive: swój
- Interrogative (prašace, interrogatiwne): štó, što, čeji, kotry, kajki, hdy, kak, hdźe, kelko
- Relative (poćahowe, relatiwne): kiž, kotryž, čejiž
- Negative (zaprěwace, negatiwne): formed with the prefix ni- from interrogatives: nichtó “nobody,” ničo “nothing,” ničeji “no one’s,” nikajki “no kind of,” nihdy “never,” nihdźe “nowhere”
- Indefinite (bjezmězne, indefinitne): formed with the prefix ně- from interrogatives: něchtó “someone,” něšto “something,” něčeji “someone’s,” někajki “some kind of,” něhdy “sometime,” něhdźe “somewhere”
- Generalizing (spowšitkowujiwace): wšón, wšitkón, kóždy
- Emphatic / Exclusive (limitatiwne): sam, samy, samón
- Defining / Qualifying (hódnoćace): samsny, jenaki

Declension of personal pronouns of the first and second person:

Case	First person			Second person		
Case	I	We	We two (dual)	You (singular)	You (plural)	You both
Nominative	ja	my	mój	ty	wy	wój
Genitive	mje, mnje	nas	naju	tebje, će	was	waju
Dative	mi, mni	nam	namaj	tebi, ći	wam	wamaj
Accusative	mje, mnje	nas	naju	tebje, će	was	waju
Instrumental	mnu	nami	namaj	tobu	wami	wamaj
Locative	mni	nas	namaj	tebi	was	wamaj

Declension of personal pronouns of the third person:

Case	Singular number				Dual number		Plural number	
Case		Masculine	Neuter	Feminine	Personal-masculine forms	Non-personal-masculine forms	Personal-masculine forms	Non-personal-masculine forms
Nominative		wón	wono, wone	wona	wonaj	wonej	woni	wone
Genitive		jeho, njeho		jeje, njeje	jeju, njeju		jich, nich	
Dative		jemu, njemu		jej, njej	jimaj, nimaj		jim, nim	
Accusative	inanimate	jón, njón	je, jo, nje, njo	ju, nju	jeju, njeju	jej, njej	jich, nich	je, nje
Accusative	animate	jeho, njeho	je, jo, nje, njo	ju, nju	jeju, njeju	jej, njej	jich, nich	je, nje
Instrumental		nim		njej	nimaj		nimi	
Locative		nim		njej	nimaj		nich	

After prepositions, the forms of third-person pronouns beginning with n- are used: bjez njeho — “without him.”

==== Adverbs ====
Adverbs (adwerby, přisłowjesniki) in the Upper Sorbian language are divided into determinative (determinatiwne) and circumstantial (adwerby wobstejenja). The former are further divided into qualitative (kwalitatiwne), which define an action or state from the point of view of quality (krasnje — “beautifully,” derje — “hard,” ćicho — “quietly”), and quantitative (kwantitatiwne).

Adverbs are formed from adjectives using the suffixes -e, -o, and -i. The most productive suffix is -e: słabje (“weakly”), hrubje (“roughly”), wědomje (“consciously”), měrliwje (“peacefully”), nahle (“suddenly,” “sharply”), mile (“gently,” “kindly”), twjerdźe (“firmly,” “strictly”), rjenje (“beautifully,” “well”), čisće (“cleanly,” “brightly”), etc. The suffix -o predominates in the position after velar consonants: ćicho (“quietly”), sucho (“dryly”), rědko (“thinly,” “rarely”), droho (“expensively”), lochko (“easily”), šěroko (“widely”), etc. Less often after velar consonants appears the suffix -e: hłuboce (alongside hłuboko) (“deeply”), wusce (alongside wusko) (“narrowly,” “tightly”), słódce (alongside słódko) (“sweetly”), etc. Unlike the forms with -e, the forms with -o can have a predicative function.

Determinative adverbs can form degrees of comparison — comparative (komparatiw) and superlative (superlatiw). The comparative degree is usually formed by adding the suffix -(i)šo/-(y)šo to the base: słabje — słabšo, sylnje — sylnišo. From adverbs ending in -ko and -sko, comparative forms are formed using the suffixes -e and -šo: blisko — bliže/blišo, hłuboko — hłubje/hłubšo. The forms with -e have an archaic flavor. From some adverbs, the comparative degree is suppletive: derje — lěpje (“hard” — “better”), zlě — hórje (“bad” — “worse”), dołho — dlěje (“long” — “longer”), mało — mjenje (“little” — “less”), wjele/mnoho — wjace (“much” — “more”). The superlative degree is formed by attaching the prefix naj- to the comparative form: słabšo — najsłabšo, sylnišo — najsylnišo.

Verb

The Upper Sorbian language is characterized by verb categories (werb, słowjeso) such as tense (tempus, čas), mood, aspect (aspekt, wid), voice, person (wosoba), number, and gender. Within the tense category, besides present and future forms, there are forms of several past tenses: perfect, synthetic preterite, pluperfect, and iterative preterite. The preterite is a historical past tense used in narration. The pluperfect indicates an action that occurred before some moment in the past. The iterative preterite indicates repeated actions in the past. Upper Sorbian has a peculiar implementation of aspect (perfective or imperfective), and like many Slavic languages, has active and passive voices, three moods (indicative, imperative, and subjunctive), forms for first, second, and third person in singular, dual, or plural; grammatical gender is expressed only in some verb forms.

Depending on the stem vowel in the present tense form (-e-, -i-, and -a-), verbs in Upper Sorbian are divided into three conjugation classes. Verb forms are formed from infinitive or present tense stems, except for a small number of preterite forms and nominal forms with special stems. In personal verb forms, corresponding personal pronouns are usually omitted (they are used only to emphasize person and number). When addressing a single person formally (“you” polite), the verb form in analytical constructions is used in the plural, while the nominal components remain singular.

Present tense

Present tense (prezent) forms in Upper Sorbian are formed synthetically. Perfective verbs may express an action performed constantly or at the current moment, sometimes repeatedly and each time completed, and also an action in the future if additionally expressed by lexical means, or in the past (also with imperfective verbs — the so-called “historical present”).

Examples of verb conjugations: njesć (“to carry”) — e-conjugation, warić (“to boil”) — i-conjugation, dźěłać (“to work”) — a-conjugation:

Person	Singular			Dual			Plural		
Person	-e-	-i-	-a-	-e-	-i-	-a-	-e-	-i-	-a-
1st	njesu	warju	dźěłam	njesemoj	warimoj	dźěłamoj	njesemy	warimy	dźěłamy
2nd	njeseš	wariš	dźěłaš	njesetaj/-tej	waritaj/-tej	dźěłataj/-tej	njeseće	wariće	dźěłaće
3d	njese	wari	dźěła	njesetaj/-tej	waritaj/-tej	dźěłataj/-tej	njesu/njeseja	warja	dźěłaja

Besides the verbs of the three conjugation classes, there also exist specially conjugated so-called irregular verbs, such as być (“to be”) — ja sym; ty sy; wón, wone (wono), wona je; mój smój; wój staj/stej; wonaj/wonej staj/stej; my smy; wy sće; woni/wone su; měć (“to have”), chcyć (“to want”), dać (“to give”), hić (“to go”), jěć (“to ride/go by vehicle”), jěsć (“to eat”), směć (“to dare”), spać (“to sleep”), wědźeć (“to know”)

Future tense

Excluding the synthetically formed future tense forms of the verbs być — budu, budźeš…, měć (“to have”) — změju, změješ…, verbs of directed motion (hić (“to go”) — póńdu, póńdźeš…, njesć (“to carry”) — ponjesu, ponjeseš…, lězć (“to climb”), wjezć (“to drive/transport”), běžeć (“to run”), ćahnyć (“to pull”)), etc., all future tense forms of verbs are formed analytically by combining the personal forms of the auxiliary verb być in the future tense (budu, budźeš, budźe, etc.) with the infinitive of the main verb. In the literary language, analytic forms are formed only from imperfective verbs — budu warić (“I will cook”), while in colloquial speech analytic forms can also be formed from perfective verbs — budu zwarić.

Examples of conjugation of the verb pić (“to drink”) in the future tense:

Person	Singular	Dual	Plural
1st	budu pić	budźemoj pić	budźemy pić
2nd	budźeš pić	budźetaj/budźetej pić	budźeće pić
3rd	budźe pić	budźetaj/budźetej pić	budu/budź(ej)a pić

Perfect tense

Perfect forms are formed using the personal forms of the verb być in the present tense and the -l- participle of the main verb. The perfect denotes an action in the past that still retains a connection to the present. The perfect is obligatorily used when the time of the action occurs before the described situation; in other cases, the perfect is used alongside the synthetic preterite. The perfect can also express an action that will be completed by some point in the future.

Examples of conjugation of the perfect forms of the verb dźěłać (“to work”):

Person	Singular	Dual	Plural
1st	sym dźěłał/-ła/-ło	smój dźěłałoj	smy dźěłali/-łe (Note: Verb forms ending with -li are personal masculine forms)
2nd	sy dźěłał/-ła/-ło	staj/stej dźěłałoj	sće dźěłali/-łe
3rd	je dźěłał/-ła/-ło	staj/stej dźěłałoj	su dźěłali/-łe

A number of participles have stems with -d-, -t-, -s-, -st-, -k-, and -h-: jědł from jěsć (“to eat”), mjetł from mjesć (“to sweep”), pasł from pasć (“to pasture/graze”), rostł from rosć (“to grow”), pjekł from pjec (“to bake”), móhł from móc (“to be able to/can”), etc.

From the verb hić (“to go”), participles are formed from a special stem: šoł, šla, šłoj, šli, šłe.

Synthetic preterite

The forms of the synthetic preterite express the completion of an action in the past, the connection of which with the present is not felt. In the 2nd and 3rd person singular, perfective verbs take endings of the old aorist, while imperfective verbs take imperfect endings. These forms may be formed from different stems — from the infinitive, from the present tense stem, and from a special stem with the formative -(j)a. In colloquial speech, perfect forms are often used instead of them..

Examples of conjugation of the verbs wuknyć (“to study, learn”) and nawuknyć (“to learn/completely study”) in the synthetic preterite:

Person	Singular	Dual	Plural
1st	wuknjech, nawuknych	wuknjechmoj, nawuknychmoj	wuknjechmy, nawuknychmy
2nd	wuknješe, nawukny	wuknještaj/-štej, nawuknyštaj/-štej	wuknješe, nawuknyše
3rd	wuknješe, nawukny	wuknještaj/-štej, nawuknyštaj/-štej	wuknjechu, nawuknychu

Pluperfect

The pluperfect (past perfect) is formed analytically using the verb być in the preterite form and the -l- participle of the main verb, indicating a completed action that preceded some situation in the past

Examples of conjugation of the pluperfect forms of the verb dźěłać (“to work”):

Person	Singular	Dual	Plural
1st	běch dźěłał/-ła/-ło	běchmoj dźěłałoj	běchmy dźěłali/-łe
2nd	bě(še) dźěłał/-ła/-ło	běštaj/štej dźěłałoj	běšće dźěłali/-łe
3rd	bě(še) dźěłał/-ła/-ło	běštaj/štej dźěłałoj	běchu dźěłali/-łe

Iterative preterite

Forms of the iterative preterite, which denote repeated events in the past, coincide with the forms of the subjunctive mood,

Subjunctive mood

Forms of the verb in the subjunctive mood are formed using the aorist forms of the auxiliary verb być and the -l- participle of the main verb. In colloquial Upper Sorbian, the verb być in the subjunctive mood loses its personal endings, and the form by is the same for all persons. Modal verbs can form subjunctive forms even without the personal forms of być ,

Examples of conjugation of the verb dźěłać (“to work”) in the subjunctive mood:

Person	Singular	Dual	Plural
1st	bych dźěłał/-ła/-ło	bychmoj dźěłałoj	bychmy dźěłali/-łe
2nd	by dźěłał/-ła/-ło	byštaj/štej dźěłałoj	byšće dźěłali/-łe
3rd	by dźěłał/-ła/-ło	byštaj/štej dźěłałoj	bychu dźěłali/-łe

Previously, forms of the subjunctive mood in the past tense were also used, formed with the verb być in the imperfect from the stem bud-: budźech, budźeše, budźechmoj, budźeštaj, budźeštej, budźechmy, budźešće, budźechu.

Imperative mood

Forms of the verb in the imperative mood are formed from the present tense stem. Examples of conjugation of the verb wzać (“to take”) in the imperative mood: wozmi (“take!”) with the ending -i after groups of consonants, and also a zero ending is possible — kupuj (“buy”) (2nd person singular); wozmimoj, wozmitaj/-tej (1st and 2nd person dual, where in the 2nd person masculine personal forms mostly end with -taj, and others with -tej); wozmimy, wozmiće (1st and 2nd person plural).

When forming imperative verb forms, consonant changes occur in the stem: -d-, -t-, -k- change to -dź-, -ć-, -č-; -n- changes to -ń-; -s- and -z- change to -š- and -ž-. Some verbs have irregular imperative forms: jěs (“eat”), daj (“give”), and others. Indicative mood forms with the particle njech replace nonexistent 1st person singular and 3rd person imperative forms in all numbers.

Person	Singular	Dual	Plural
1st	buch přeprošeny/-a/-e	buchmoj přeprošenaj	buchmy přeprošene/-ni
2nd	bu přeprošeny/-a/-e	buštaj/štej přeprošenaj/-ej	bušće přeprošene/-ni
3rd	bu přeprošeny/-a/-e	buštaj/štej přeprošenaj/-ej	buchu přeprošene/-ni

Direct passive forms compete with, on one hand, constructions of the same participles with -n-/-t- combined with forms of the verb być in any tense (including past — from the stem bě-: běch přeprošeny (“I was invited”), but also sym přeprošeny (“I am invited”), budu přeprošeny (“I will be invited”)), which express a state; and on the other hand — active voice forms with the reflexive particle so, e.g.: z uniwersity Lwow na Ukrainje přeprosy so delegacija na ekskursiju do Łužicy (“A delegation was invited from the University of Lviv in Ukraine for an excursion to Lusatia”). The passive or active meaning of such forms is determined by context.

Indirect passive forms are formed with personal forms of the verbs dóstać (“to receive”), dóstawać (“to be receiving”) and the participle of the main verb with -n-/-t- . In colloquial speech, the passive voice is expressed by constructions with the German loan verb wordować ("to become").

Verb aspects

Alongside imperfective and perfective verbs forming aspectual pairs, Upper Sorbian has verbs without aspectual pairs (single-aspect verbs) and verbs whose imperfective and perfective meanings are expressed by one lexeme (double-aspect verbs). Aspectual pairs are mostly formed by prefixes and suffixes.

Most non-prefixed verbs are imperfective: dźěłać (“to work”), warić (“to boil”), słyšeć (“to hear”), etc. Only a small part are perfective. Perfective verbs are mainly formed from imperfective non-prefixed verbs by prefixation: rězać (“to cut”) — zarězać (“to cut down, slaughter”), stajeć (“to put”) — zestajeć (“to compose, put together”), etc. Paired imperfective verbs can be formed from prefixed perfective verbs by suffixes -owa-/-uj, -wa- or -a- (-ě-): zapisać (“to write down”) — zapisować (“to be writing down”), wubrać (“to choose”) — wuběrać (“to be choosing”), etc. Secondary prefixation is also possible: zabić (“to kill”) — dozabić (“to finish killing”).

Under German influence in colloquial Upper Sorbian, present tense forms of perfective verbs may be used with an actual present meaning, which is not permitted in the literary language.

Participles and gerunds

Upper Sorbian includes the following participial forms:

- Active present participle: formed from the short present stem with suffix -ac(y) or from the infinitive stem with suffix -c(y) (rarely -uc(y)): pisacy (“writing”), słyšacy (“hearing”), etc.
- Present gerund: formed from the short or extended present stem of imperfective verbs with suffix -o, rarely -(i)cy, -ucy: njeso (“leading”), kopajo/kopajcy (“digging”), etc.
- Passive participle: formed from the infinitive stem or full present stem with suffixes -n(y) or -t(y): wuknjeny (“being studied”), nawuknjeny (“studied”), wupity (“drunk”), etc.
- Past gerund: formed from the infinitive stem of perfective verbs with ending -wši or from the present stem with ending -ši: rozkopawši (“having dug”), zdźěławši (“having worked out”), zamjetši (“having swept”), etc.

In colloquial Upper Sorbian and dialects, present gerunds are very rarely used or absent, and past gerunds are not used at all.

Infinitive

The infinitive in Upper Sorbian is formed with the suffix -ć, except verbs with stems ending in -k, -h: pjec (“to bake”), rjec (“to say”), móc (“to be able”). Like in most other Slavic languages, the supine (preserved in Lower Sorbian) has been replaced by the infinitive in Upper Sorbian.

Verbal noun

Verbal nouns are formed with the suffix -(j)e from the participle stem with -n-/-t- : wuknjenje (“learning”), słyšenje (“hearing”).

Prepositions

Prepositions (prepozicije, předłóžki) in Upper Sorbian are divided into primary and secondary:

- Primary prepositions (prěnjotne, primarne) used exclusively as prepositions: bjez (“without”), dla (“because of, for”), do (“to, until, behind, before”, etc.), k (“to, for”), mjez (“between”), na (“on, about, for, at”), nad (“above”), po (“after, along”), pod (“under, near”), podłu (“along”), pola (“near”), porno (“next to, alongside”), pře (“against, because of”), před (“before, until, from”), při (“at”), spod (“from under”), w (“in, into”), wo (“about”), wob (“through, during”), wot (“from”), z (“from, out of”), za (“behind, instead of, for”), zeza (“because of”), etc.
- Secondary prepositions (druhotne, sekundarne), derived from full words and not yet fully detached from them: blisko (“nearby”), dale (“beyond”), nimo (“except”), niže (“below”), njedaloko (“nearby”), spody (“under”), srjedź (“among”), wyše (“above”), zady (“behind”), zboka (“beside”), zespody (“from below”).

Primary prepositions ending with consonants (e.g., w, z, k, bjez, přez, wot, nad, pod, mjez, před) may vocalize — add a vowel -e (or -y for mjez) at the end if the following word starts with a consonant cluster or a consonant of the same place of articulation, e.g. ze wšeho (“from all”), wote dnja (“from the day”), we wodźe (“in water”), ke choremu (“to the sick one”).

Particles

Like prepositions or conjunctions, particles (časćicy, partikle) in Upper Sorbian are divided into primary and secondary.

Functionally, particles are divided into word-forming, form-building, and modal particles.

F. Michalk divides Upper Sorbian particles into:

- intensifiers: ha (“just”), da (“well, just”), pak (“and, just”), no (“well, here”) etc.,
- semantic modifiers: wjace (“more”), hišće (“still”), hižo (“already”), hakle (“barely, only”), jenož (“only”), hač (“until, if”), wšak (“however, still”), nic (“not, no, none”) etc.,
- grammatical: forming reflexive verbs so (“-self”), negative -nje (“not”), interrogative -li (“if, how, whether”), and words for negation — ně (“no”) — and affirmation — haj (“yes”).

Interjections

Interjections (interjekcije, wukřičniki) in Upper Sorbian are divided into:

- expressive (začućowe), expressing emotions: a, aha, ach (“ah, oh”), aj (“ouch”), aw (“ouch”), fuj, hehe, jej (“oh no”),
- vocative (wolowe, apelowe), expressing will or desire and used for addressing the listener: hop, pst, hej (“hey”),
- onomatopoeic (zwukinapodobnjowace, onomatopetiske), imitating natural sounds: bac, buc, bim, bom, buch, gigagak, kikeriki.

Syntax Upper Sorbian syntax has the following features:

- A characteristic feature distinguishing Upper Sorbian from most other Slavic languages is the order of main components in a simple sentence: Subject – Object – Verb (S–O–V): Naš dźěd drjewo kała (“Our grandfather chops wood”); Ludźo so wjelkow boja (“People are afraid of wolves”). If the predicate is compound, the auxiliary verb follows the subject, and the nominal part is at the end: Dobru chwilu bě hišće jich hołk a dźiwi spěw słyšeć (where bě is auxiliary, słyšeć is nominal part — “For quite a while their wild shouting and strange singing were still heard”). This syntactic construction is called frame construction.
- Presence of a copula in sentences with nominal predicate: Nan je doma (“Father is at home”); Ja sym strowy (“I am healthy”).
- The second position (after the first stressed word or phrase) in a sentence is often occupied by short forms of reflexive and personal pronouns: mje, mi, će, ći, jón, je, ju, so, sej, as well as some conjunctions and particles: drje (“really”), pak (“just”), wšak (“however”), etc. For example: Hač drje waša mać bórze přińdźe? (“Will your mother really come soon?”). The reflexive particle so can also occupy the second position, with the main verb at the sentence end: Ja so přez tón dar wjeselu (“I am happy about this gift”). Or immediately after the main verb: Ja wjeselu so přez tón dar (“I am happy about this gift”).
- When a modifier consists of a noun in genitive singular followed by an adjective or possessive pronoun agreeing with it and placed after the modified noun (Dźěći mojeho bratra — “My brother’s children”; Drasta stareje žony — “The old woman’s dress”), changing the modifier to be before the modified noun causes the genitive noun to become a possessive adjective with suffixes -owy-/-iny-: Mojeho bratrowe dźěći (literally “my brother’s children”); Stareje žonina drasta (“old woman’s dress”). Possessive adjectives with these suffixes are considered a separate part of speech — possessives — in modern Upper Sorbian grammar (G. Faska).
- The nominal part of compound predicates expressed by a noun in instrumental case is very rare; expressed by an adjective it never stands in the instrumental: Wowka so wróći strowa (“Grandmother returned healthy”).
- Use of constructions with accusative noun + infinitive: Wutrobu čuješe spěšnje kłapać (“He felt his heart beating fast”). Verbs like stać (“stand”), ležeć (“lie”), sedźeć (“sit”), spać (“sleep”), tčeć (“be located, stick out”) do not occur in such constructions with infinitive; instead, present gerund is used.
- Genitive case forms with negation are very rare, mainly used in colloquial Upper Sorbian after the particle ani: Ani slowa wón njepraji (“He did not say a word”).
- Negation of the copula uses nominative case forms: Wón tu njeje (“He is not here”, literally “He here not is”).
- Nouns take nominative case if two or more adjectives modify them: Serbski a ruski lud (“The Sorbian and Russian peoples”).
- Family names in the genitive of possession precede the modified word: Markec swójba (“The Markec family”).
- When the modifier follows the modified noun (Wuměnjenja, přijomne za nas — “Conditions pleasant for us”), changing the modifier to precede the noun reverses the word order inside the modifier group: Za nas přijomne wuměnjenja (“For us pleasant conditions”).
- The relative pronoun kotryž, kotrež, kotraž (“which”) in the genitive stands before the modified noun: To je ta stwa, kotrejež wokna do zahrodki hladaja (“This is the room whose windows look into the garden”).

Vocabulary

As a result of long contacts with the German language (for about 1000 years), Upper Sorbian has borrowed a large number of Germanic lexical items, with their number being higher in dialectal speech than in the literary language. At the same time, the core lexical stock of Upper Sorbian remains Slavic — H. Bilfeldt counts no more than 2000 German words among the most common borrowings. Besides direct borrowings, the literary language also contains calques from German words — ćah (“train”) < German Zug, stawizny (“history”) < German Geschichte, wócny kraj (“fatherland”) < German Vaterland, and so on. Some German borrowings often differ significantly from words in contemporary German, as they entered Upper Sorbian relatively early; for example, the verb cwiblować (“to doubt”) was borrowed from Middle High German zwivelen, which differs from the modern German zweifeln, changed after the diphthongization of i. There are also borrowings from other Slavic languages, primarily from Czech (strój (“machine”) < Czech stroj, basnik (“poet”) < Czech básník, dźiwadło (“theatre”) < Czech divadlo, hudźba (“music”) < Czech hudba, etc.), though these are generally restricted to the literary language.

Examples of lexical differences between spoken and literary language:

	Spoken language	Literary language	German
glasses	bryla, brle	nawoči	Brille
thousand	tawzynt	tysac	Tausend
to become	wordować	stać so	werden
clock/watch	zejger	časnik	Zeiger
armchair	zesl	křesło	Sessel
money	fenki	pjenjezy	Pfennige

== Samples ==
Serbskej zemi by J. Bart-Čišinski

O zemja serbska! twoju nož chcu chwalić rolu,
chcu chroble sławić twoje městna starodawne
a wožiwjować twojich synow mjena sławne,
njech wutroba tež rozkoći so z dźiwjej bolu.

O zemja serbska! z kuzłom swojim moju wolu
bróń, zo bych wotkrył starych časow slědy krwawne
a słyšał, kak so z njebjes woła myto sprawne
na cuzu złósć přez twoje hory, hona, holu.

O zemja serbska! chwalić twoje płódne hona
chcu, hory módre, spěwow cunjozrudne hrona
a sławić ćichu nadobnosć chcu twojoh' ludu.

O zemja serbska! nihdy tebje njezabudu!
Twój wobraz widźu w myslenju a wosrjedź sona
mi twoje mjeno klinci kaž zwuk jasnoh' zwona.

O Sorb land! Your fields I want to praise,
boldly to honor your ancient towns,
and to revive the glorious names of your sons,
even if my heart breaks from wild pain.

O Sorb land! With your magic defend my will,
that I may uncover bloody traces of old times,
and hear how from the heavens calls the just reward
against the enemy’s malice across your mountains, fields, and forests.

O Sorb land! I want to praise your fertile fields,
blue mountains, the sad melodies of songs,
and to glorify the quiet nobility of your people.

O Sorb land! I will never forget you!
I see your image in thoughts and in the midst of dreams,
your name sounds to me like the clear ringing of a bell.

The Lord's Prayer in Upper Sorbian:

Wótče naš, kiž sy w njebjesach. Swjeć so Twoje mjeno. Přińdź Twoje kralestwo. Stań so Twoja wola, kaž na njebju, tak na zemi. Wšědny chlěb naš daj nam dźens. Wodaj nam naše winy, jako my tež wodawamy swojim winikam. A njewjedź nas do spytowanja, ale wumóž nas wot złeho. Amen.

Article 1 of the Universal Declaration of Human Rights in Upper Sorbian:

Wšitcy čłowjekojo su wot naroda swobodni a su jenacy po dostojnosći a prawach. Woni su z rozumom a swědomjom wobdarjeni a maja mjezsobu w duchu bratrowstwa wobchadźeć.

(All human beings are born free and equal in dignity and rights. They are endowed with reason and conscience and should act towards one another in a spirit of brotherhood.)

A text in colloquial Upper Sorbian:

Text	German Translation
Alzo, po nas we swójbe dawe jen nałožk, kotryž my kóžde lěto jutre činimy, a to na jutrownej póndźeli. Po tym zo běchu nedźelu naše křižerjo po puću, so naša cóła swójba zetka jutre póndźelu šiponu. Alzo to rěka wowka, dźědo, šě wuje ha ćete, kuzine, kuzenki. A mó so pon šě hrómadźe na puć podamo do jedno blisko lěsa, to jo někak dwacci mejnšiny pěši zdalene wot našej wowki. A tam mamo mó jenu tajku małku hórku srejdź lěsa, hdźež žane štómu nejsu. Ha tam sej mó pon šece naše deki połožimo, ha mó dźěći hale tež te dorosćene so do lěsa podamo ha tam te dariki, kotrež jo jutrowne zajac, kwazi naš dźěd, do to schował, te mó pon šece pótamo. Nanajhušćišo su to někajke [malič...] maličkosće ha słódkosće, warene jeja. Ha pon mó tam šě hrómadźe sejdźimo ha te jeja do so tykamo ha cyle jednore hrómadźe rěčimo, to jo jemo jen zes tych małoch wókomikow, zo šě hrómadźe šińdu. Ha ći křižerjo z našeje swójby su wězo tej wesoło, zo móža wone kusk wotpočnć po tym, haj, napinacym jutrownym jěchanju. Ha to zno moja wowka zes jeje staršimi činiła, moje starši su to čineli, hdyž su wone mało bóli, ha něk mó to zno tež činimo, ha to bě šece na tón samsny blak, ha mó budźemo to zawěsće tež šće šec tak dale wešć, haj. To jo poprawom šo	Also, bei uns in der Familie gibt es einen Brauch, den wir jedes Jahr an Ostern machen, und das am Ostermontag. Nachdem am Sonntag unsere Osterreiter unterwegs waren, trifft sich unsere ganze Familie am Ostermontag mittags. Also das heißt Großmutter, Großvater, alle Onkel und Tanten, Cousinen, Cousins. Und wir begeben uns dann alle zusammen auf den Weg in einen nahen Wald, das ist etwa zwanzig Minuten zu Fuß entfernt von unserer Großmutter. Und dort haben wir so einen kleinen Hügel mitten im Wald, wo keine Bäume sind. Und dort legen wir uns dann immer unsere Decken hin, und wir Kinder, aber auch die Erwachsenen, begeben uns in den Wald, und dort die Geschenke, die der Osterhase, das heißt unser Großvater, vorher versteckt hat, die suchen wir dann immer. Am aller häufigsten sind es irgendwelche Kleinigkeiten und Süßigkeiten, gekochte Eier. Und dann sitzen wir dort alle zusammen und stopfen die Eier in uns hinein und reden ganz einfach miteinander, das ist mal einer der wenigen Augenblicke, daß alle zusammen kommen. Und die Osterreiter aus unserer Familie sind natürlich auch froh, daß sie sich ein bißchen ausruhen können nach dem, ja, anstrengenden Osterreiten. Und das hat schon meine Großmutter mit ihren Eltern gemacht, meine Eltern haben das gemacht, als sie klein waren, und jetzt machen wir es auch schon, und es war immer zu demselben Fleck, und wir werden es bestimmt auch noch immer so weiterführen, ja. Das ist eigentlich alles.

== See also ==
- Lower Sorbian language

== Bibliography ==
- Bleakly, Evan W. (2023), "Upper Sorbian in Budyšin / Bautzen: Examples from Bautzen's Linguistic Landscape", Мова Кодифікація Компетенція Комунікація, 1–2 (6–7): 20–39, doi:10.2478/lccc-2022-0002
- Howson, Phil (2017), "Upper Sorbian", Journal of the International Phonetic Association, 47 (3): 359–367, doi:10.1017/S0025100316000414, S2CID 232350142
- Ross, Malcom. 2020. Syntax and contact-induced language change. In A. Grant (ed.) The Oxford Handbook of Language Contact. Oxford: Oxford University Press, 123–154. [Upper Sorbian and German contact, with resulting changes in Sorbian]
- Šewc-Schuster, Hinc (1984), Gramatika hornjo-serbskeje rěče, Budyšin: Ludowe nakładnistwo Domowina
- Stone, Gerald (2002), "Sorbian (Upper and Lower)", in Comrie, Bernard; Corbett, Greville G. (eds.), The Slavonic Languages, London and New York: Routledge, pp. 593–685, ISBN 9780415280785
- Zygis, Marzena (2003), "Phonetic and Phonological Aspects of Slavic Sibilant Fricatives" (PDF), ZAS Papers in Linguistics, 3: 175–213, doi:10.21248/zaspil.32.2003.191, archived from the original (PDF) on 2017-10-11
