= Adolf Černý =

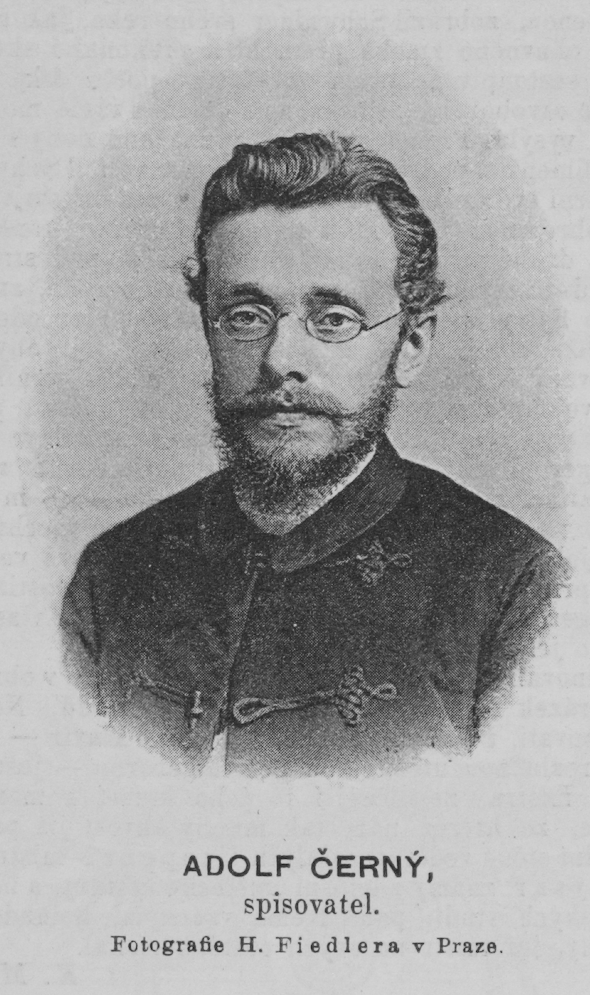
Adolf Černý in 1892, photographed by Josef Fiedler

Adolf Černý (19 August 1864 in Hradec Králové – 27 December 1952 in Prague) was a Czech linguist, translator, poet and journalist, as well as professor of Slavic studies in Prague.

His principal research focus was on the Sorbian language. Cerný also wrote poems under the pseudonym Jan Rokyta. The Jagiellonian University in Kraków awarded him an honorary doctorate in 1947.

== Works ==
- Wobydlenje Łužiskich Serbow (1889)
- Lužické obrázky (1890)
- Svatba(kwas) u Lužickych Srbů (1893)
- Mythiske bytosće Łužiskich Serbow I. (1893)
- Různé (wšelakore) listy o Lužici (1894)
- Lilie z Tvých zahrad (1899)
- Stawizny basnistwa hornjołužiskich Serbow (1910)
- Lužice a Lužičtí Srbové (1912)
- Lužická otázka (prašenje) (1918)
