= Foundation for the Sorbian People =

German foundation

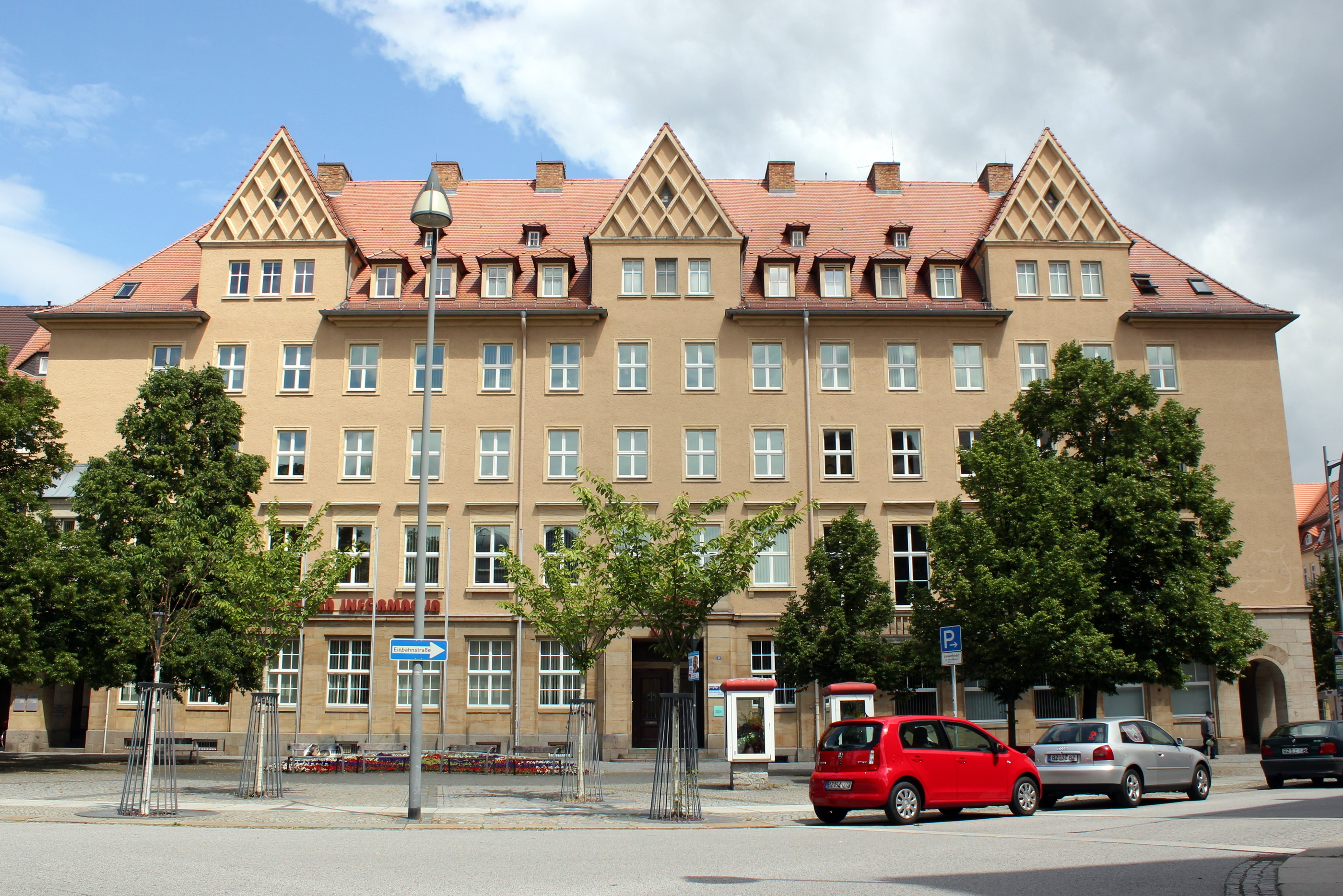
Serbski dom - seat of the Foundation for the Sorbian People in Bautzen

The Foundation for the Sorbian people (Sorbian Załožba za serbski lud; German: Stiftung für das sorbische Volk) is a nonprofit foundation of the Federal Republic of Germany and the states of Saxony and Brandenburg. It was established to preserve of the languages, culture, and traditions.

== Structure and history ==
The foundation has its seat in the house of the Sorbs in Bautzen. Additionally, it has a branch offices in Cottbus and regional offices in Crostwitz, Hoyerswerda and Schleife. The foundation was established on October 19, 1991, in the Lutheran church of Lohsa by the Federal Republic of Germany and the states of Saxony and Brandenburg.

It provides most of the funding for the Sorbian institutions, granting about 23.9 million € annually to the Sorbian National Ensemble, the Domowina including its language center Witaj, the Domowina Publishing House, the Serbski Institut, the German-Sorbian Theater, the Wendish Museum Cottbus and the Sorbian Museum Bautzen.

The foundation board consists of fifteen members, whereof six are representatives of the Sorbian people (four form Saxony and two from Brandenburg).

== Ćišinski prize ==
The foundation biennial awards the Ćišinski prize named after the Sorbian poet Jakub Bart-Ćišinski. There is a main award for extraordinary achievements and a promotion award for promising newcomers in the fields of Sorbian culture and arts. The prize contains a monetary award of €12,000 for the main award and €4,000 for the promotion award.
