= Domowina Publishing House =

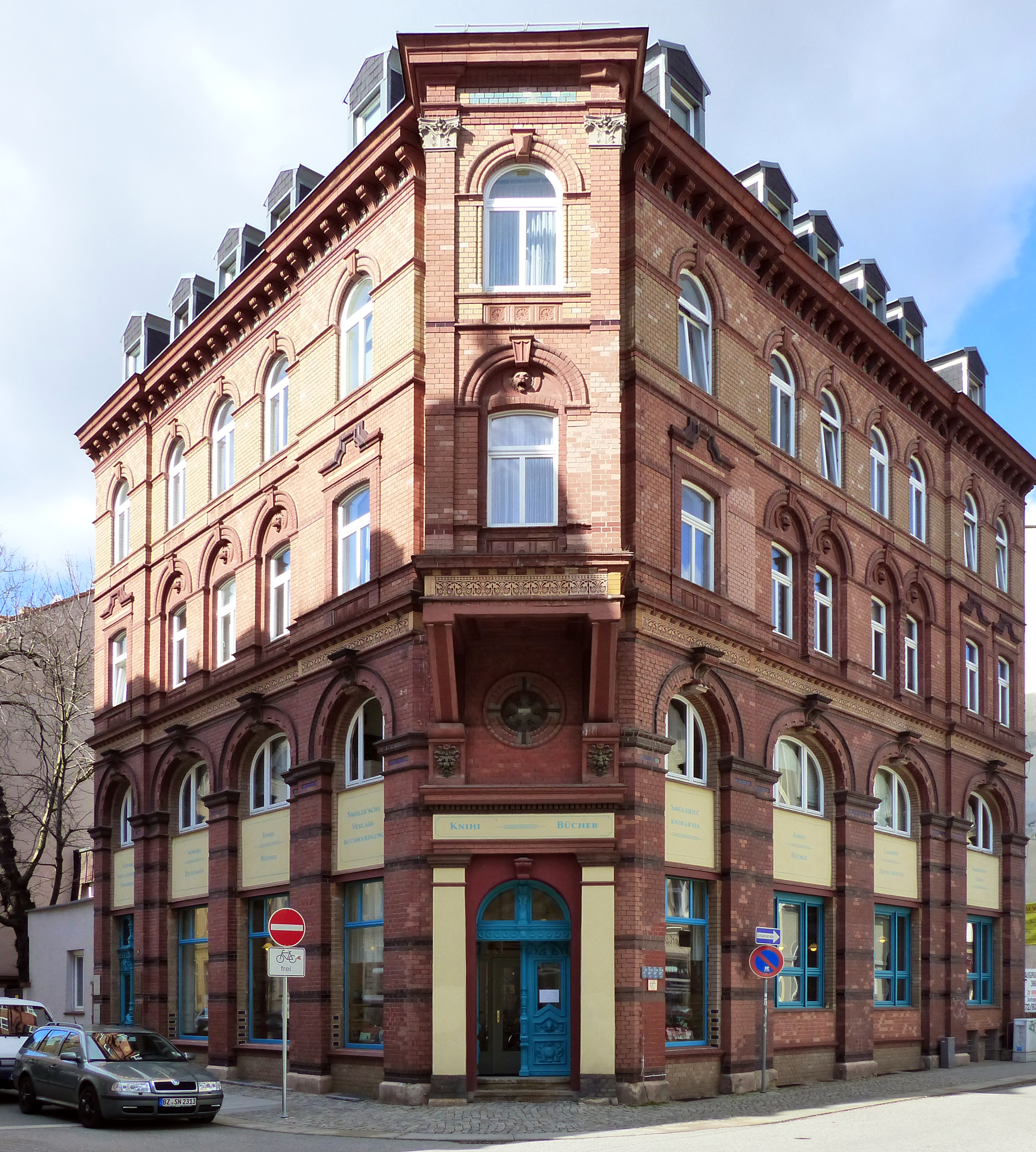
Domowina Publishing House office with the Smoler'sche Bookshop at Tuchmacherstraße 27, Bautzen

The Domowina Publishing House (German: Domowina-Verlag; Upper Sorbian: Ludowe nakładnistwo Domowina) is a publisher in Germany, which focuses on Sorbian books, journals and newspapers as well as German language literature on Sorbian topics. Although it bears the same name as the Sorbian organization Domowina, it is institutionally independent. It is owned by the Foundation for the Sorbian People and runs the Smoler'sche Bookstore at Tuchmacherstraße in Bautzen, where its office is, too.

The only Sorbian language publisher was founded on 1 July 1958 in Bautzen as a Volkseigener Betrieb and privatized after the German reunification in 1990. It publishes novels and children's books in Upper Sorbian, Lower Sorbian and German, as well as the Upper Sorbian daily newspaper Serbske Nowiny, the Lower Sorbian weekly newspaper Nowy Casnik, the Upper Sorbian weekly Catholic magazine Katolski Posoł, the monthly cultural magazine Rozhlad, and the journal Lětopis. There are about 60 new publications a year.
