= Law and Gospel (Cranach) =

Paintings by Lucas Cranach the Elder

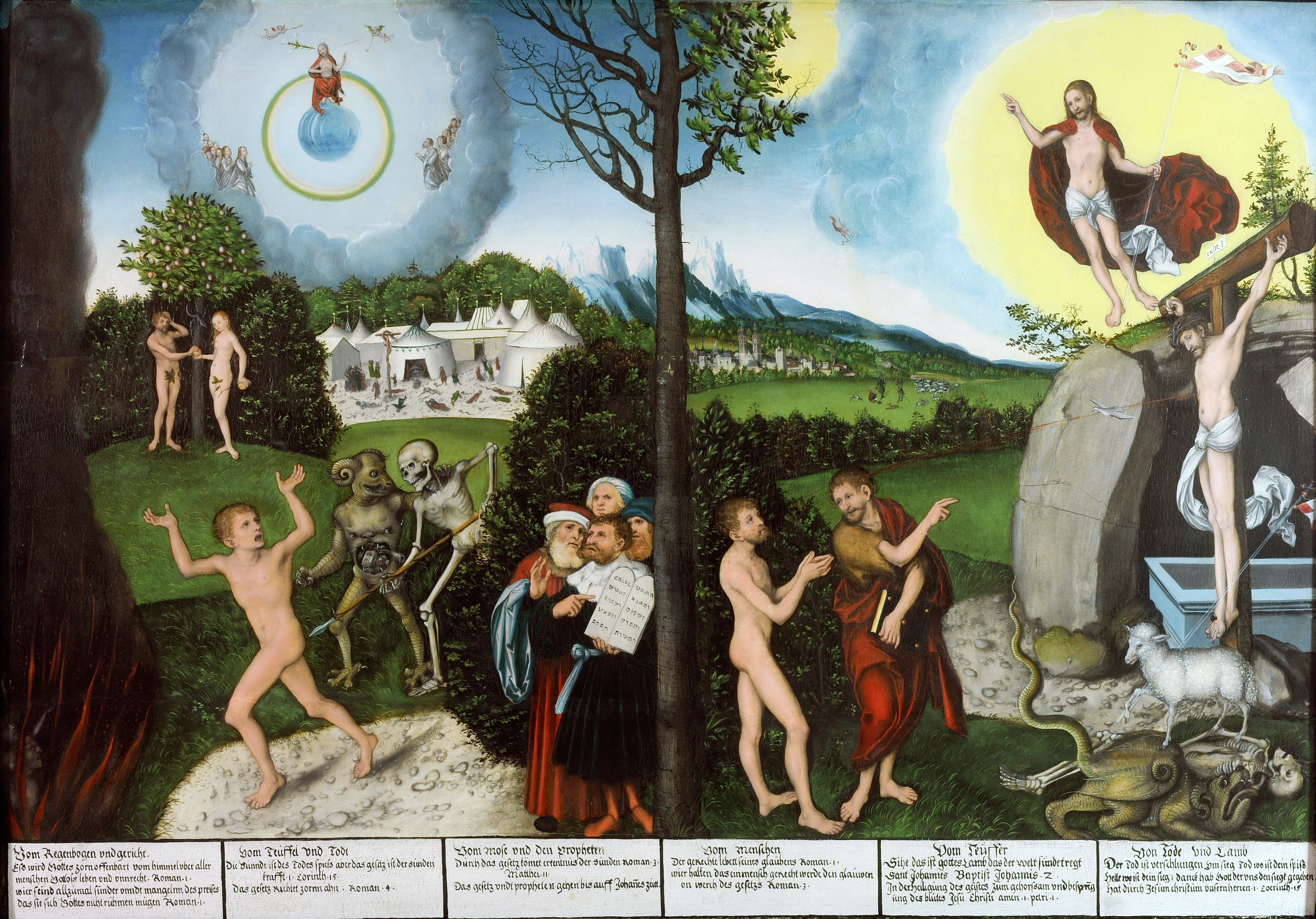
Lucas Cranach the Elder, Law and Gospel, Herzogliches Museum, Gotha, Germany. 82.2 cm × 118 cm (32.4 in × 46.5 in)

Law and Gospel (or Law and Grace) is one of a number of thematically linked, allegorical panel paintings by Lucas Cranach the Elder from about 1529. The paintings, intended to illustrate Lutheran ideas of salvation, are exemplars of Lutheran Merkbilder, which were simple, didactic illustrations of Christian doctrine.

Cranach probably drew on input from his lifelong friend Martin Luther when designing these panels, which illustrate the Protestant concept of Law and Gospel. The earliest forms of the picture are the panels in Gotha, Germany and the National Gallery in Prague; the Gotha panel is thought to be later. The paintings were the basis for many similar works by Cranach and his workshop, Lucas Cranach the Younger, and other artists in diverse forms such as printmaking, relief sculpture and household furnishings.

== Theological context ==
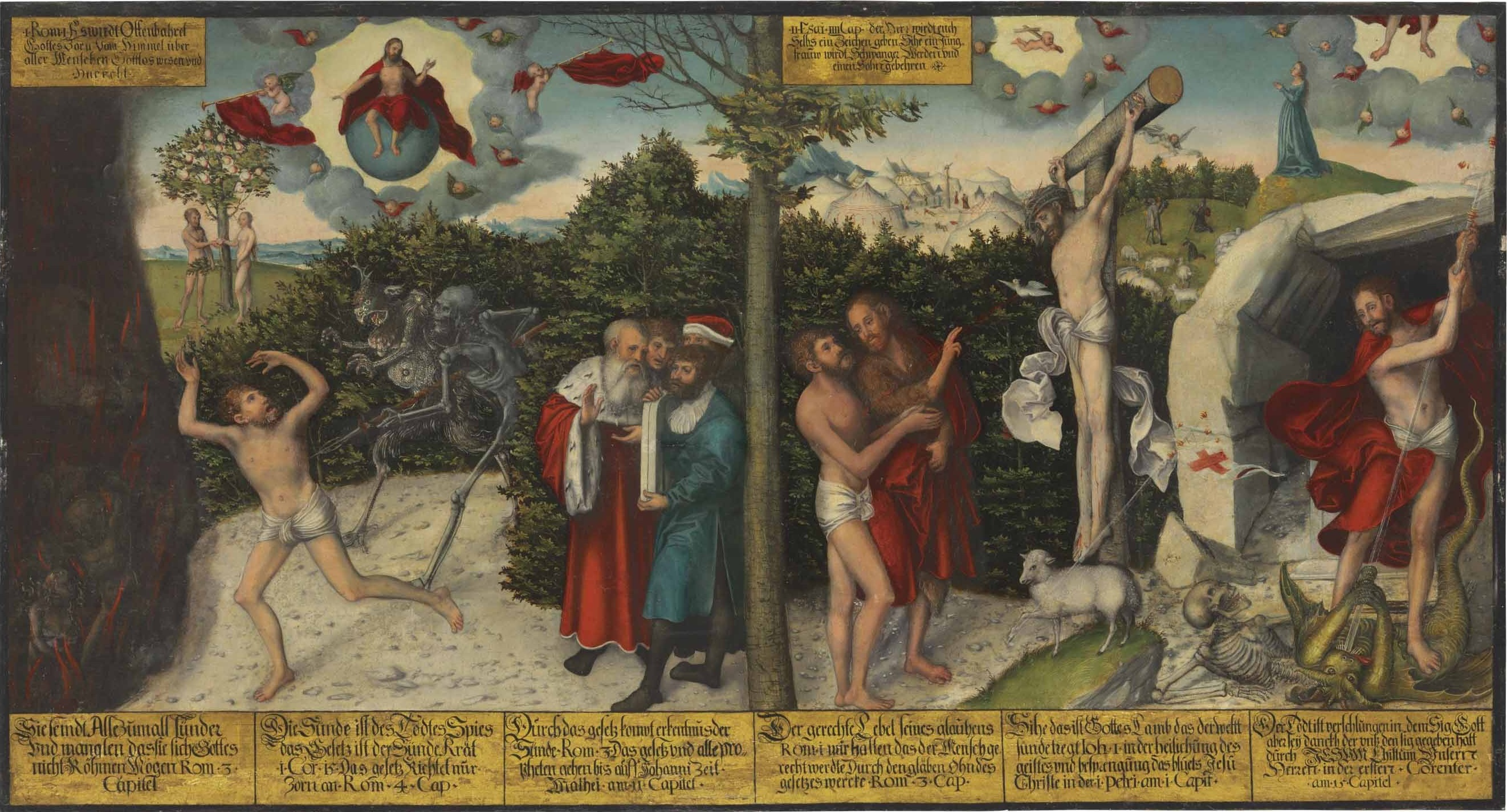
A later (1536) version by Cranach and his son. Oil, gold and paper on panel, transferred on panel

The left and right "wings" of the paintings illustrate the Protestant concept of Law and Gospel, which emphasizes salvation through the forgiveness of sins in light of the person and work of Jesus Christ. "Law", or the Old Covenant, is symbolized on the left, and "Gospel" or "Grace" on the right. The panels illustrate the Lutheran idea that Law is not sufficient for salvation, but Gospel is. As Luther wrote in 1522:

The Law is the Word in which God teaches and tells us what we are to do and not to do, as in the Ten Commandments. Now wherever human nature is alone, without the grace of God, the Law cannot be kept, because since Adam's fall in Paradise man is corrupt and has nothing but a wicked desire to sin... The other Word of God is not Law or commandment, nor does it require anything of us; but after the first Word, that of the Law, has done this work and distressful misery and poverty have been produced in the heart, God comes and offers His lovely, living Word, and promises, pledges, and obligates Himself to give grace and help, that we may get out of this misery and that all sins not only be forgiven but also blotted out... See, this divine promise of His grace and of the forgiveness of sin is properly called Gospel."

The two halves of the panel can be seen as illustrating opposing theologies. Donald Ehresmann wrote in 1967, "The way to salvation set forth on the right side ... is strikingly contrasted to the way of damnation on the left side." A more nuanced approach asks the viewer to find a dynamic relationship between Law and Gospel. Art historian Bonnie Noble suggests that in Lutheranism, "law is also the means by which the necessity of grace becomes apparent.... The painting draws a boundary between the dynamics of law and gospel (Lutheran theology) on the one hand, and law on its own (Catholicism or Judaism) on the other".

== Description ==
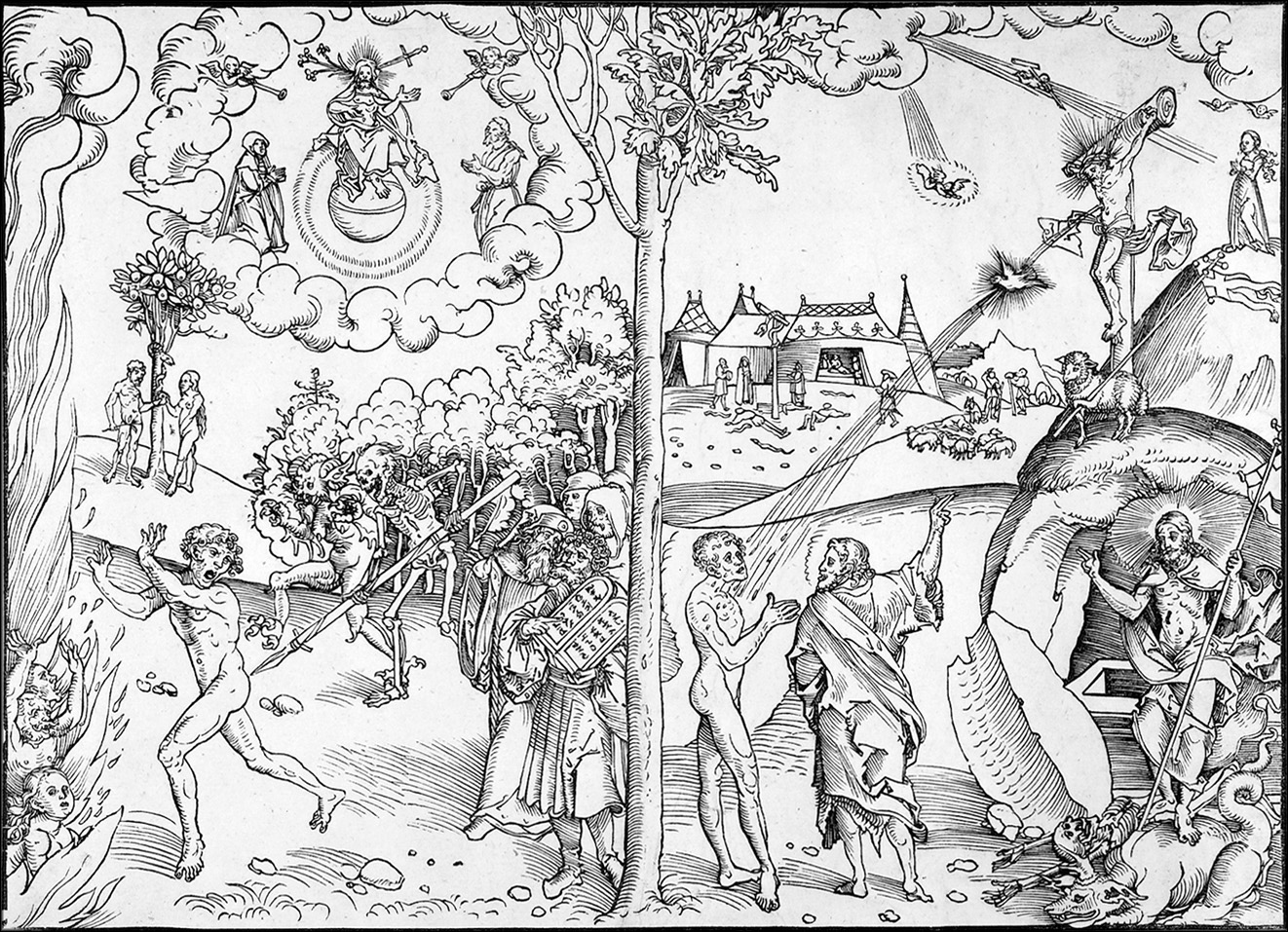
Law and Grace, woodcut. Cranach, c. 1530

On the left, "Law" side of the Gotha painting, a naked man is tormented by a demon and a skeleton (Death) as they force him toward Hell. Other motifs on the left include Christ in Judgment, the Fall of Man, the Brazen Serpent, and Moses with his tablets. On the right, "Gospel" side, a man interacts with John the Baptist, who is pointing to Jesus as if to say, "He died for you." He stands before both Christ on the Cross and the Risen Christ, whose blood streams onto the man, through the Dove (Holy Spirit), making Christ's blood into "the saving waters of baptism". The Lamb of God stands atop the trampled demons from the left half. A tree divides the two halves of the panel, shown dying on the left side but living on the "Gospel" side. The bottom of the Gotha painting has six columns of New Testament scripture in German, likely chosen by Philip Melanchthon.

The Prague version unifies the two halves by portraying one man sitting in front of the tree, flanked by a prophet on the left and John the Baptist on the right, both of whom point towards Christ. The two panels can be read somewhat differently: it is easier for the viewer to identify with the man when he is the centered subject. Temporally, the Gotha panel shows two men simultaneously facing the consequences of past actions, while the man in the Prague panel clearly has a choice before him. While his "baser" lower body points to the "Law" side, his head and torso turn affirmatively toward John and the "Gospel" half. The painting includes many of the same symbols as the Gotha panel, such as the Brazen Serpent, Moses (at top left), the Fall, and the Crucified and Risen Christ. The Virgin now stands on a hill at right. This panel originally contained text that labelled the motifs, but they were lost during cleaning. The Prague composition was the preferred one for many derivative works by Hans Holbein the Younger, Erhard Altdorfer, the engraver Geoffroy Tory and others.

Cranach moved the Brazen Serpent motif from the left side in the original two panels to the right in later versions, such as the woodcut. It is an Old Testament story in which God punishes Israelites fleeing Egypt by inflicting them with serpents; they need only look upon the serpent placed on a cross by Moses to be saved. Luther considered the story an example of faith and illustrative of Gospel. The mixture of Old and New Testament concerns in both halves of the panels illustrates that Gospel is not only found in the New Testament.

== Meaning ==
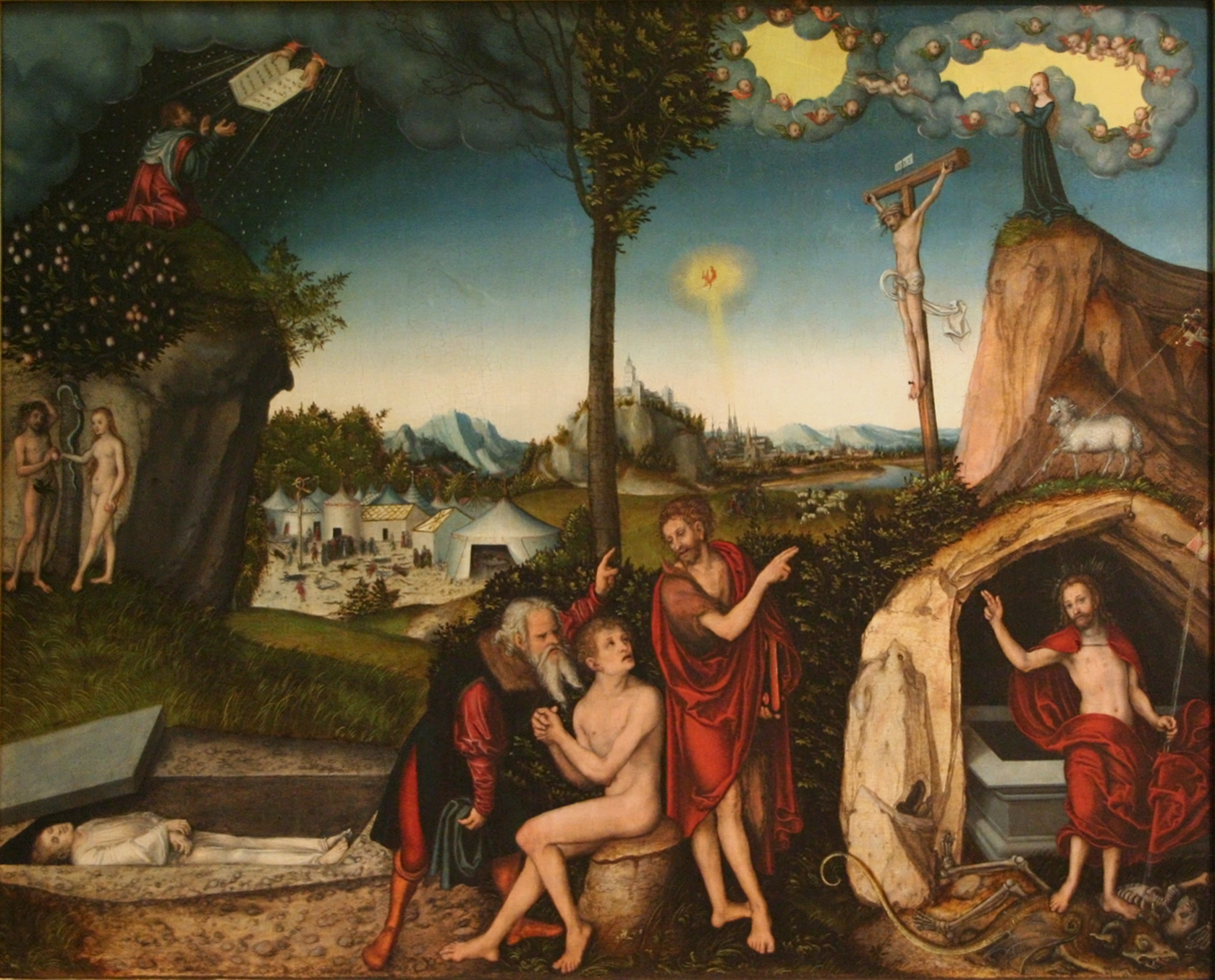
Law and Gospel, National Gallery in Prague. Tempera panel. 72 cm × 88.5 cm (28.3 in × 34.8 in)

For Luther and Cranach, artworks such as Law and Gospel were intended to instill understanding of scripture and Lutheran thought, and the images were deemed acceptable so long as they were subordinate to the written word. The role of these Reformation Merkbilder contrasted with religious art in other parts of Europe, such as Early Netherlandish and Italian Renaissance painting. According to Bonnie Noble:

Earlier art originated from nonscriptural sources and performed nebulous functions, such as to inspire pious meditations or even private visions. Pre-Reformation images could bestow merit upon the beholder and frequently became the objects of veneration themselves. The varied origins and functions of art before the Reformation offered a considerable amount of interpretive freedom to the beholder, a freedom that Lutheran views on images vehemently endeavored to curtail.

Thus the didactic format of the painting seeks to define and limit the viewer's response, making it ripe for art-historical criticism less enamored of such moral or instructive values. In one summary, Cranach's work is described as a "shallow fantasy" that fails to raise the "religious thought world of the Reformers ... to an artistic height"; it is "Protestant allegory overburdened with thoughts" and "overweighted with dry, didactic propagandistic content".

The painting has also been analyzed in terms of typology, in which correspondences between the Old and New Testaments are sought. In this case, the "Law" half is seen to illustrate the Old Testament, and the "Gospel" half the New Testament. For example, the "type" of Moses placing a serpent on a cross is answered by the "antitype" of the Crucifixion. The analysis is complicated by the appearance of Christ in Judgment, from the New Testament, on the "Law" side, and by the Old Testament's Brazen Serpent motif on the "Gospel" side in later versions of the panel.

== See also ==
- Lutheran art
- Art in the Protestant Reformation and Counter-Reformation

== Works cited ==
- Koerner, Joseph Leo (1993). The Moment of Self-Portraiture in German Renaissance Art. University of Chicago Press. ISBN 9780226449999.
- Noble, Bonnie (2009). Lucas Cranach the Elder: Art and Devotion of the German Reformation. University Press of America. ISBN 978-0-7618-4337-5.
- Weimer, Christoph (2009). "Luther and Cranach on Justification in Word and Image". In Wengert, Timothy J. (ed.). The Pastoral Luther: Essays on Martin Luther's Practical Theology. Wm. B. Eerdmans Publishing. pp. 292–309. ISBN 978-0-8028-6351-5.
