= Nostitz =

Nostitz refers to

- Nostitz (Weißenberg), a place in Saxony, Germany
- Nostitz family, a Silesian aristocratic family named after the place, including a list of notable family members
