= Law in Christianity =

Law in Christianity may refer to:

- Christian views on the Old Covenant
- Law and Gospel
- Antinomianism
- Legalism (theology)
- Canon law
- Christianity and politics
