= Law and Grace (Prague) =

Painting by Lucas Cranach the Elder

Lucas Cranach the Elder - Law and Grace, National Gallery in Prague

Law and Grace (also The Original Sin; The Redemption of Mankind; Law and Gospel; Damnation and Salvation; The Fall and the Redemption of Mankind, The Old Testament as Lex and the New Testament as Gratia, in German: Sündenfall und Erlösung or Gesetz und Gnade, Gesetz und Evangelium) is considered one of the most important paintings by Lucas Cranach the Elder.

This work, in the collection of the National Gallery in Prague, is one of the two oldest known versions of this theme and was executed in 1529 - the other is in Gotha. It is also called the Prague type and provided the model for a series of other paintings including an early-16th-century copy that is also kept in the Prague National Gallery's collection of Old European art. It is the best-known and most influential allegory depicting the fundamental tenets of Luther's reform of the church.

== History ==
The picture's origins are not known, but it was probably commissioned for a church in north Bohemia. In the late 18th century it was the property of the Lords of Vrbno, from where it came into the collection of Count Johann Nepomuk von Nostitz-Rieneck. Between 1814 and 1922 it was loaned from his collection to the Picture Gallery of the Society of Patriotic Friends of Art. In 1922 the picture was returned to its owners and in 1950 it was acquired by the National Gallery in Prague.

The copy of the picture also comes from the property of the Lords of Vrbno. In 1800 it was loaned to the National Gallery in Prague by Marie Anna Thun, née Kolowrat-Liebsteinsky.

== Description ==
Law and Grace, Lucas Cranach the Elder (copy of the 16th-century painting), National Gallery in Prague

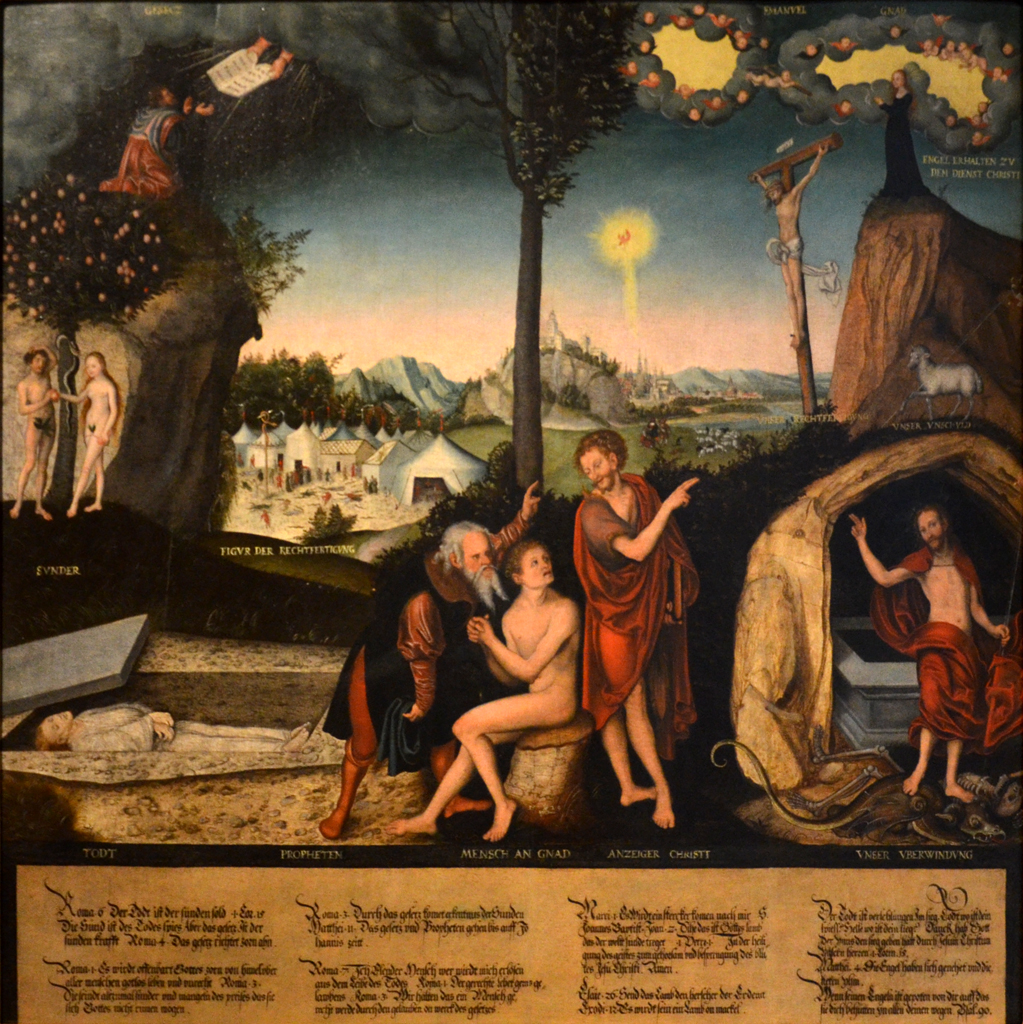
Law and Grace, early copy of the painting

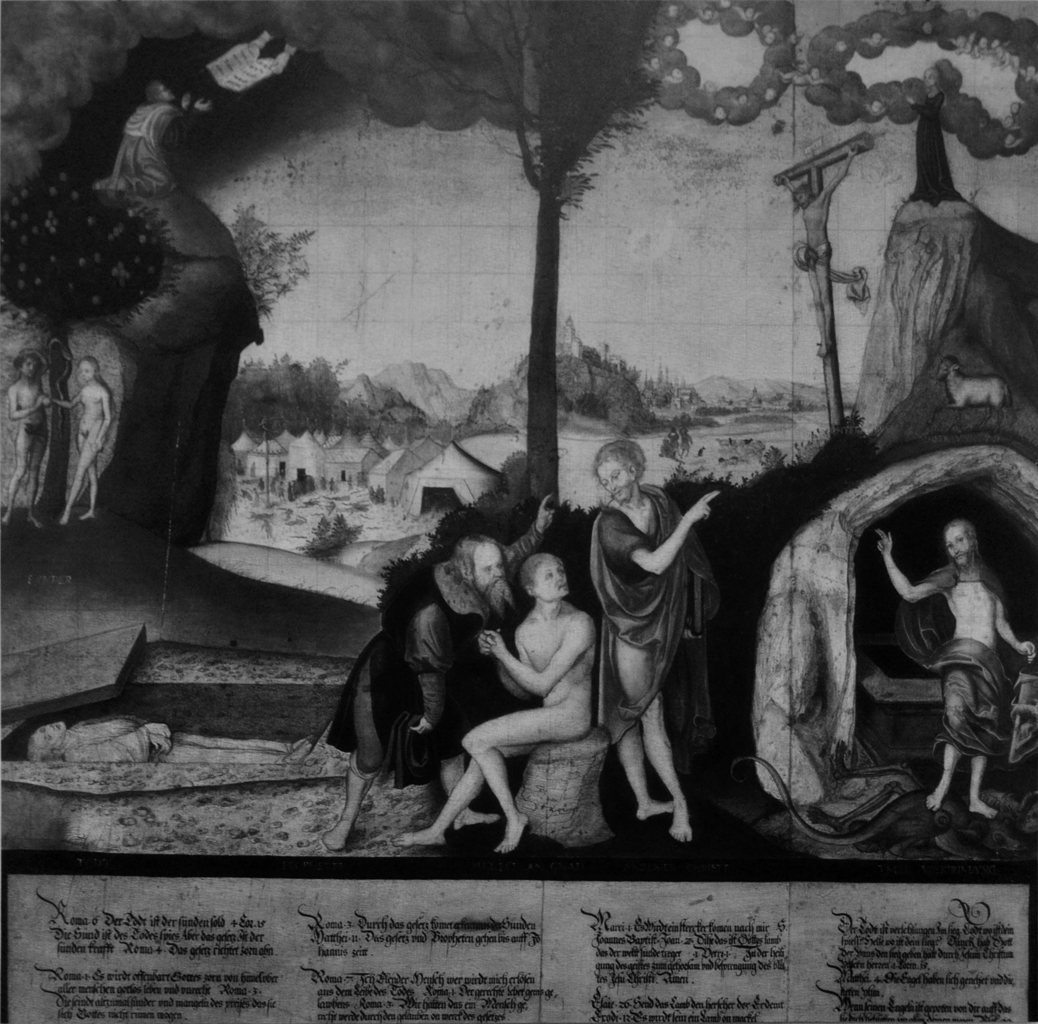
Law and Grace, IRR scan with a squared grid

Oil on lime-wood panel. The dimensions of 72 x 88.5 cm are the result of the sides and bottom part of the original picture being cut off before 1815. The missing bottom part contained texts and survives in the copy of the picture that is also in the collection of the National Gallery in Prague. Infrared reflectography revealed underdrawing executed freehand with numerous small details determining the physiognomy of the figures. The painting adheres to the underdrawing and only occasionally makes the form more specific.

Infrared reflectography examination of the copy of the original picture measuring 87 x 88.5 cm, whose visual composition is identical to the original but which still retains the texts, revealed a squared grid that was used in making it. The pigment used and the painting style correspond with a date of origin around the mid-16th century. The texts in German precisely identify the individual figures and scenes, explaining their meaning. The image is thus an important means of interpreting Luther's teaching on ‘justification by faith’.

== Interpretation ==
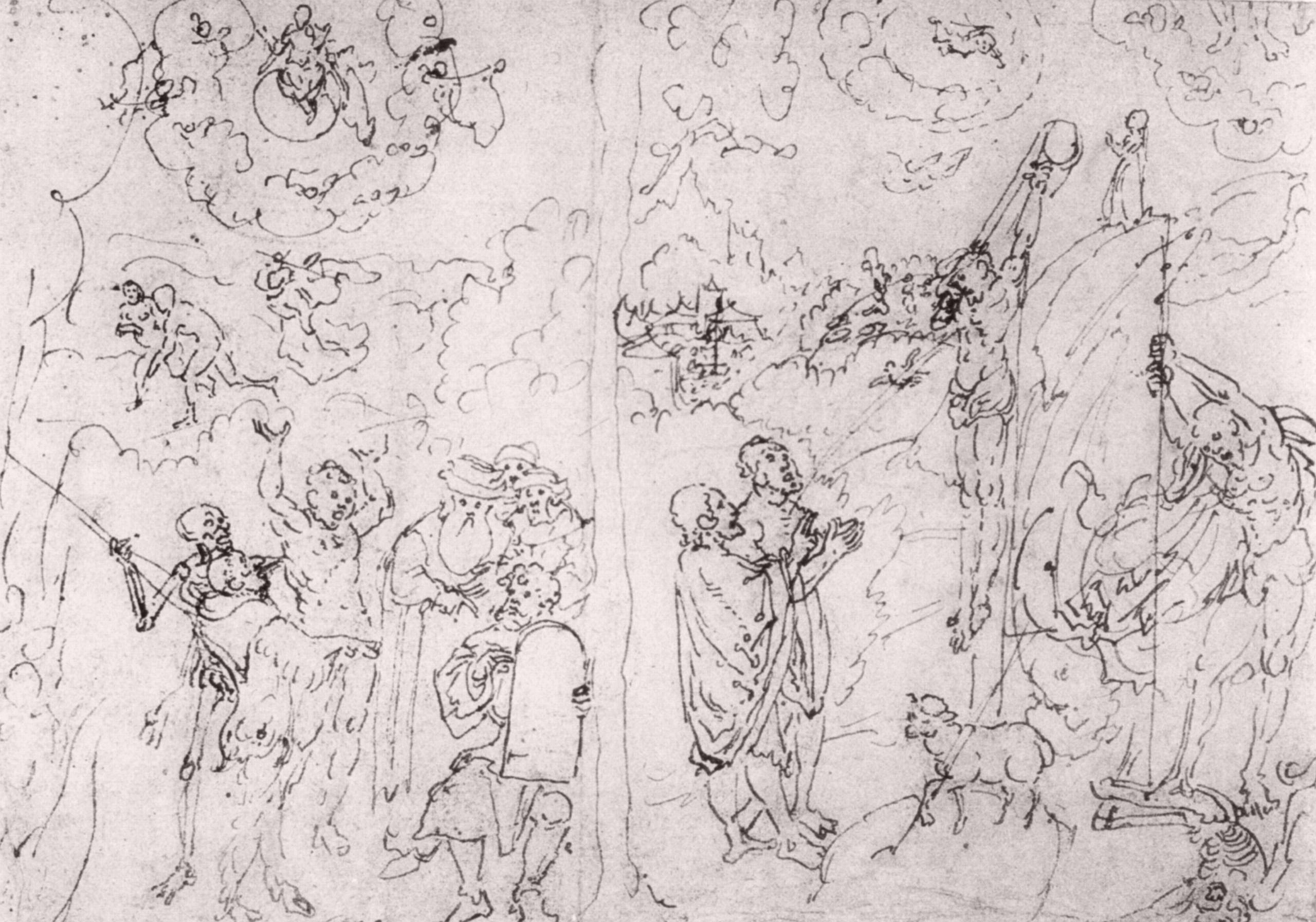
Law and Grace, drawing by Lucas Cranach the Elder (1529)

The painting is symmetrically divided into two halves by the Tree of Life whose branches are dry on the left and green on the right. The left half (sub lege) depicts the stories of the Old Testament: the kneeling Moses receiving the tablets of the Ten Commandments on Mount Sinai; Adam and Eve under the Tree of Knowledge; the camp of the Israelites who have defied God and are dying after being bitten by venomous snakes; a pole with the raised-up serpent in the desert – the bronze serpent that protected those who looked up to it; and an open tomb with a dead person as the symbol of death.

The naked man sitting in the middle under the tree, his body on the side of sin (Law) and his head turned to the side of Grace, is being spoken to from the left by the Old Testament prophet Isaiah, who is pointing to the Crucified Redeemer in the other half of the scene portraying symbols of Divine Mercy. John the Baptist, who is turning to the man from the right-hand side of the picture, shows the Lamb of God with a Heraldic flag – the symbol of salvation. In another version (Nuremberg, 1529), the Lamb stands in the middle and the resurrected Christ triumphs over death.

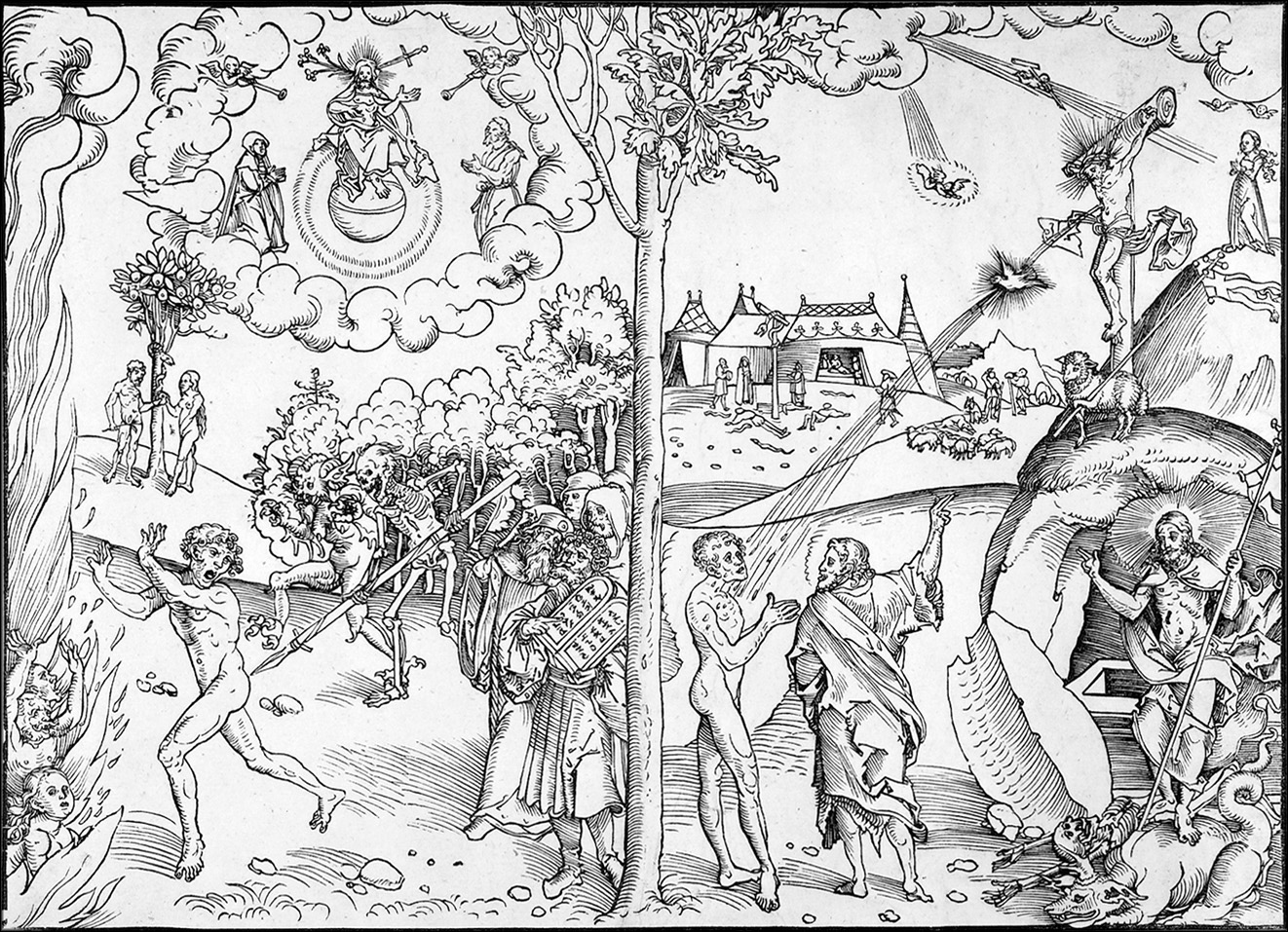
Law and Grace, woodcut by Lucas Cranach the Elder (1529-1530)

On the right-hand side (sub gratis), scenes from the New Testament are depicted: the Crucifixion and the Lamb of God; Mary on Mount Zion symbolising the faithful who meekly and humbly submit to God's will; Christ incarnate with the cross flying from a choir of angels to Mary; and the Annunciation to the shepherds in the background. The resurrected Jesus stands in the foreground and he crushes underfoot the serpent and a human skeleton as symbols of the devil and death.

In his work De Servo Arbitrio (1525), Martin Luther bases his ideas on the Letter of Paul to the Romans and explains his concept more specifically. Also influenced by Philip Melanchthon, Cranach's visual interpretation of Luther's teaching dates from the period after 1528. It explains the difference between Catholicism (based on the Old Testament) and Protestantism (based on belief in Divine Mercy). Following the publication of Melanchton's Augsburg Confession (1530), the painting thus symbolised a highly topical image of the Church at a crossroads.

== Other versions ==
Cranach produced several other compositions on the theme of ‘Law and Mercy’ that adhere to the arrangement of two halves depicting the Old and New Testament. In their details, however, they differ markedly. The first similar depiction is Cranach's illustration for the title page of Luther’s work Auslegung der Evangelien vom Advent bis cum Ostern (1528, Wittenberg) that corresponds with the Prague picture, which is one of two surviving early types.

Four scenes on the panels of the winged altarpiece in the church of St Wolfgang in Schneeberg (1532-1539) have similar composition. This altarpiece is accompanied by a predella depicting the Last Supper in which the apostles receive the blood of Christ in the form of wine. The updated version of the original composition, that Lucas Cranach the Younger also worked on, also includes the Pope among the sinners in the flames of hell. According to the chronicle of the town of Jáchymov (Joachimsthal), an altarpiece made in Cranach's workshop portrayed among the apostles both Cranach the Elder and Cranach the Younger, Martin Luther and Frederick the Wise, Elector of Saxony. Luther and Melanchton are likewise portrayed as apostles on the retable of the castle church in Dessau (1565) and Cranach the Younger brings them wine.

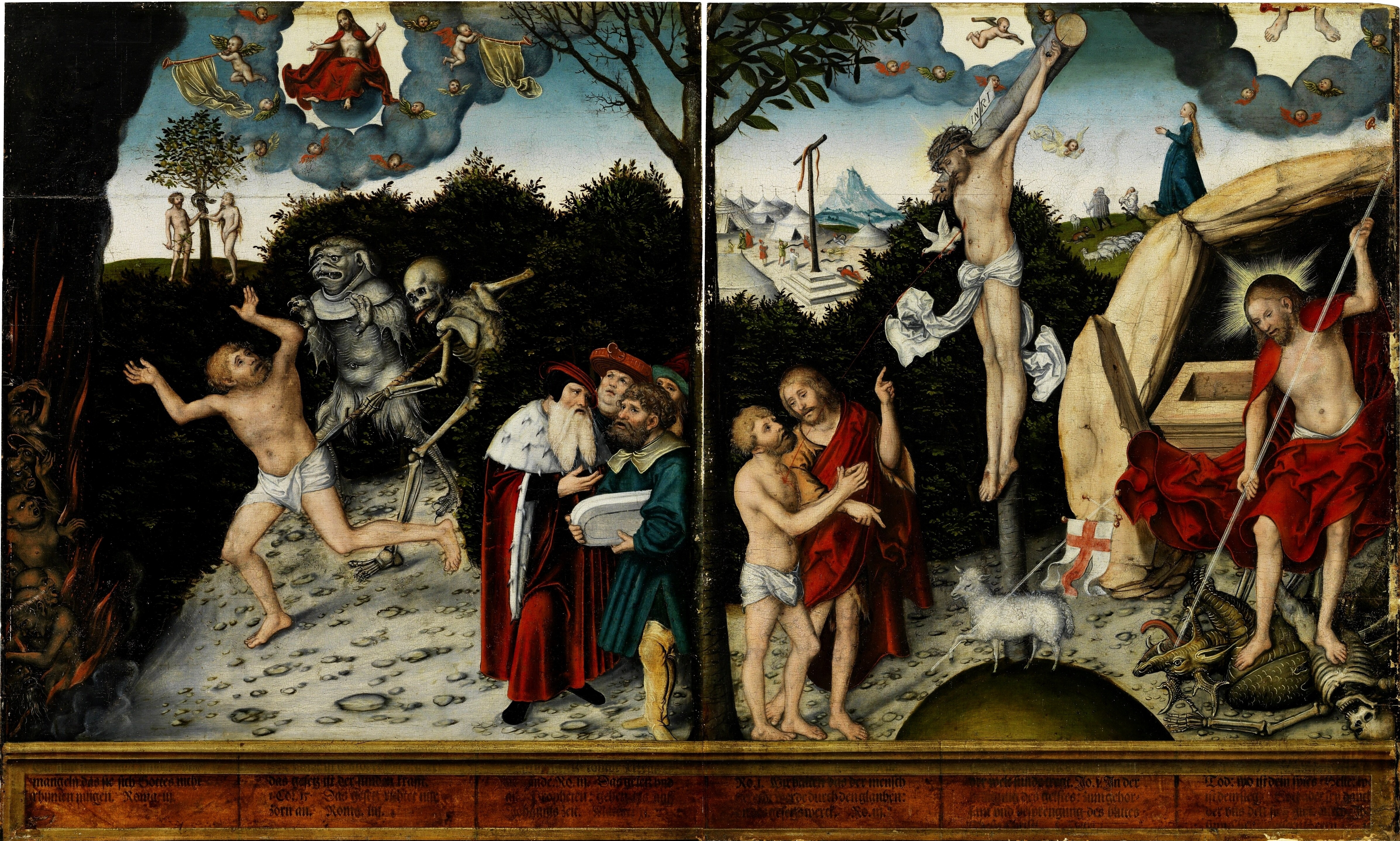
Law and Grace (1529), Germanisches Nationalmuseum Norimberk

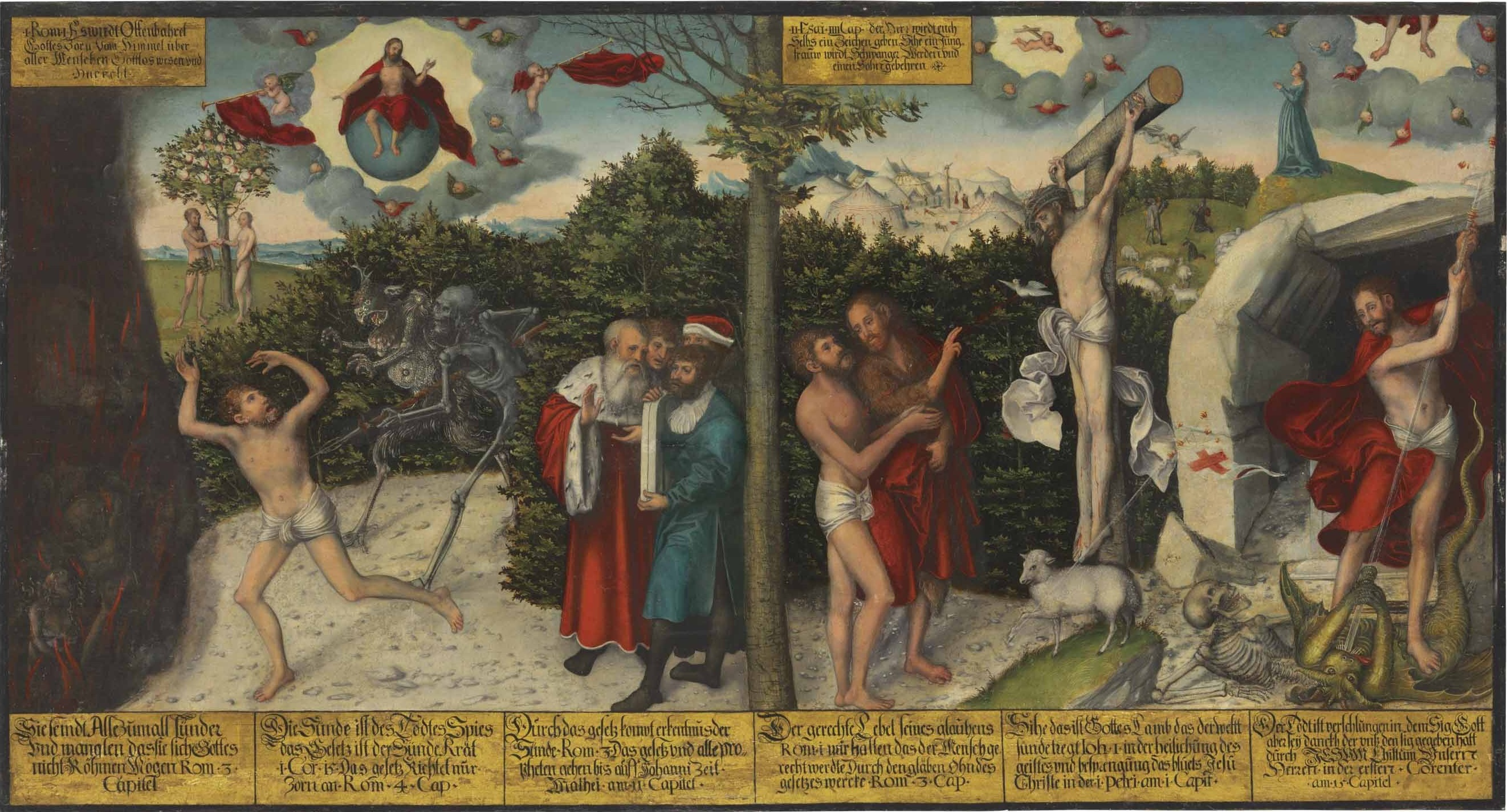
Damnation and Redemption (1536), private collection

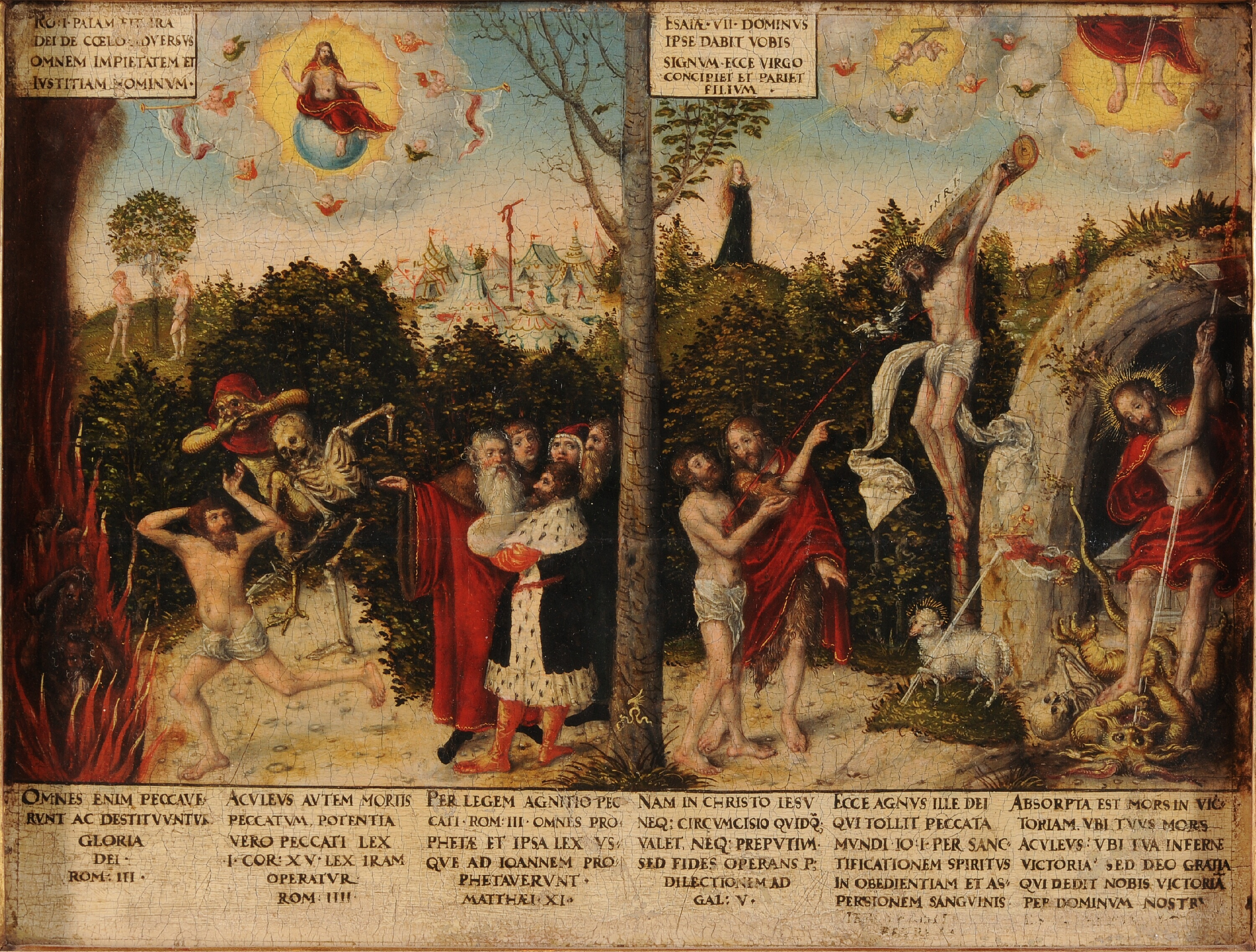
Law and Grace (1550), Lutherhaus Wittenberg

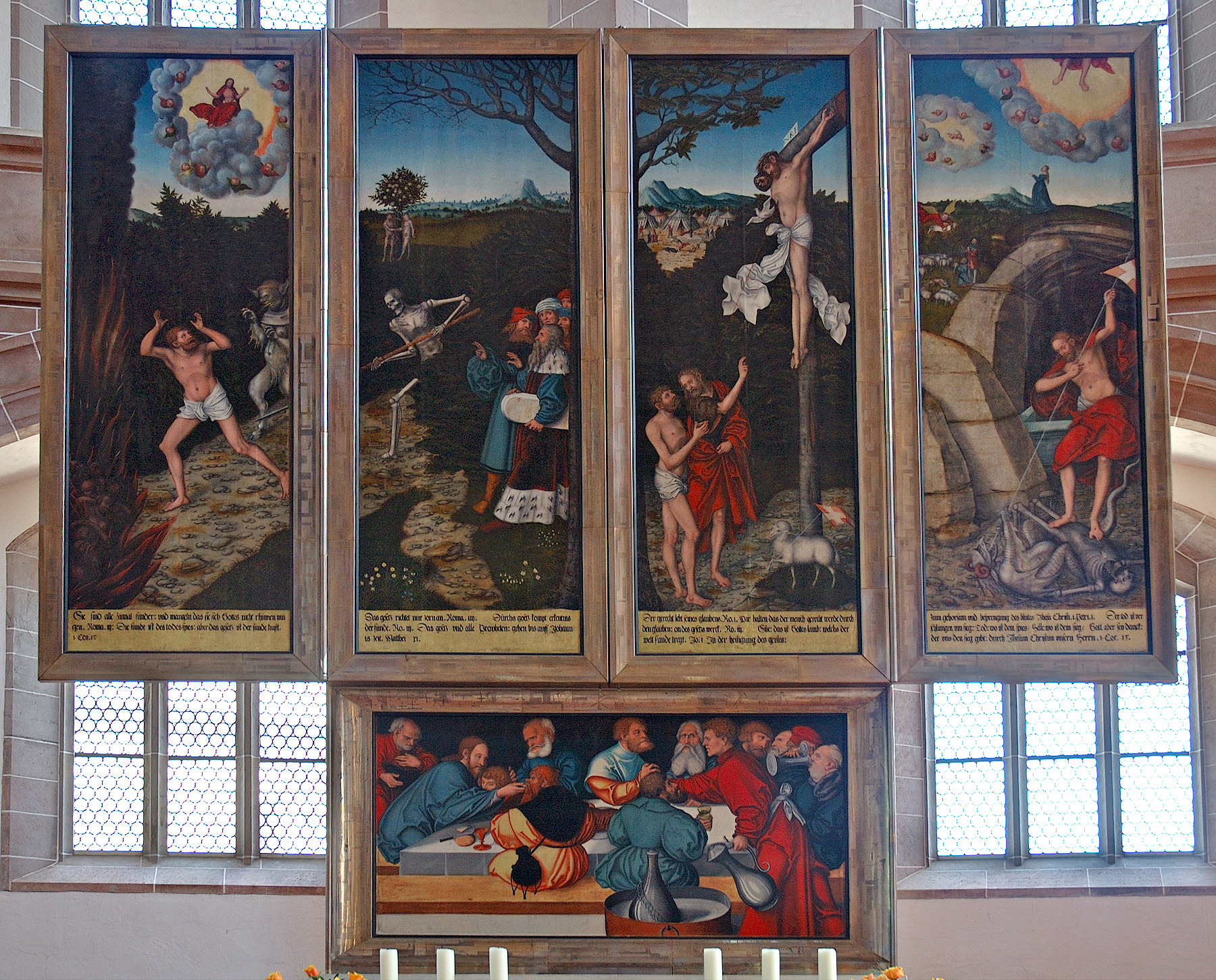
St. Wolfgangskirche altarpiece in Schneeberg (1532-1539)

== Works influenced by Law and Grace ==
=== Czech Republic ===
- Altarpiece retable, Church of St. Joachim in Jáchymov (commissioned by the Counts of Schlick, destroyed in a fire in 1873)
- Mural painting, Pardubice Castle
- Mural painting, exterior of the monastery church of St. Michael the Archangel, Horažďovice
- Mural paintings, castle chapel in Horšovský Týn
- Mural paintings, Church of St. Wenceslaus, Moravská Ostrava
- Cloister of the Dominican Monastery in České Budějovice
- Epitaph stone relief, cemetery Church of St. Mary, Broumov
- Epitaph wooden relief of the Grigersdorf family in Jordanov (1596)
- Painted epitaph, Church of SS Peter and Paul, Bernartice (1571)
- Illumination, Bartoloměj Netolický (Melantrich) Bible

=== Other ===
- An Allegory of the Old and New Testaments by Hans Holbein the Younger
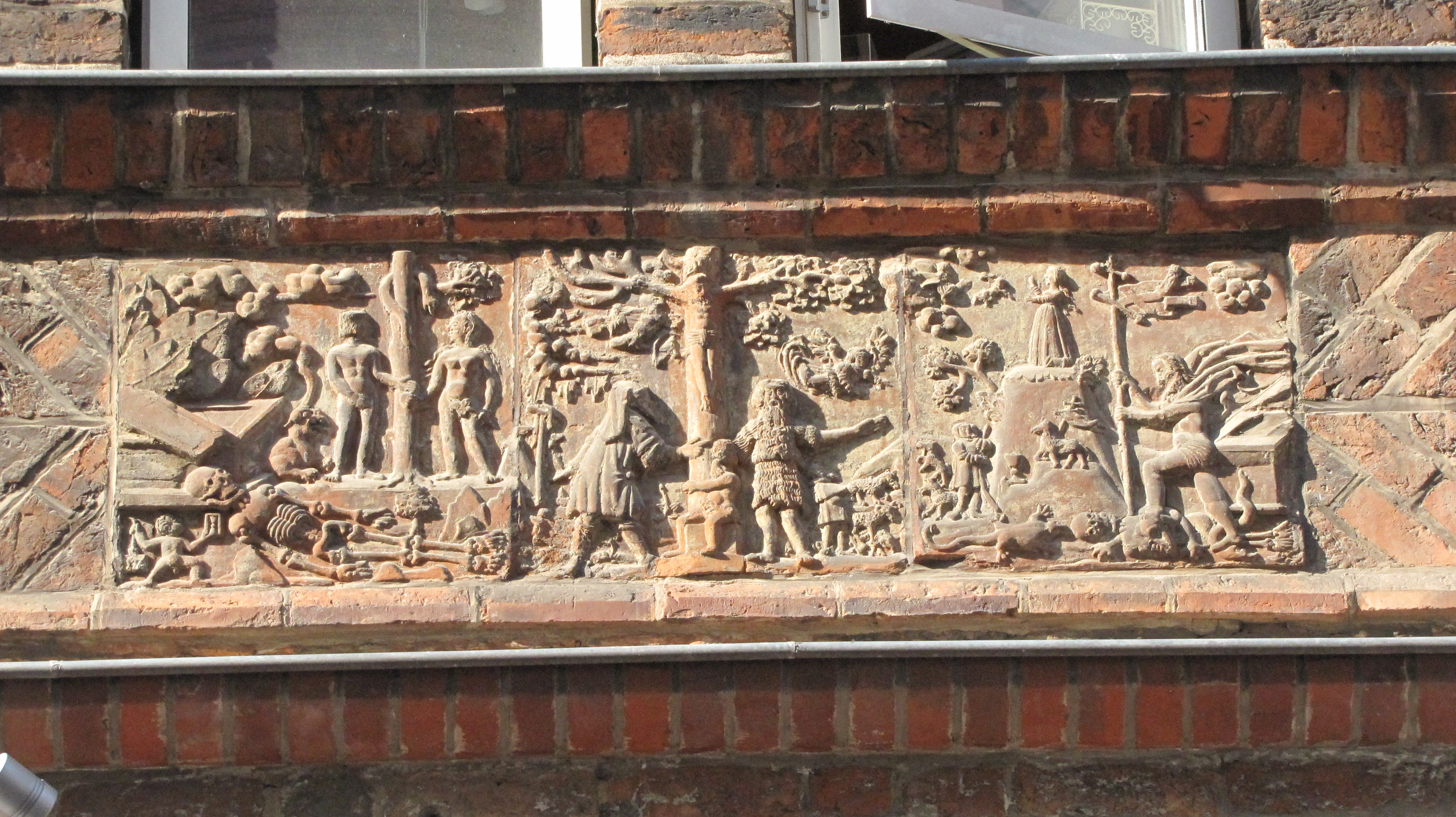
Law and Grace, relief (around 1650), Lübeck

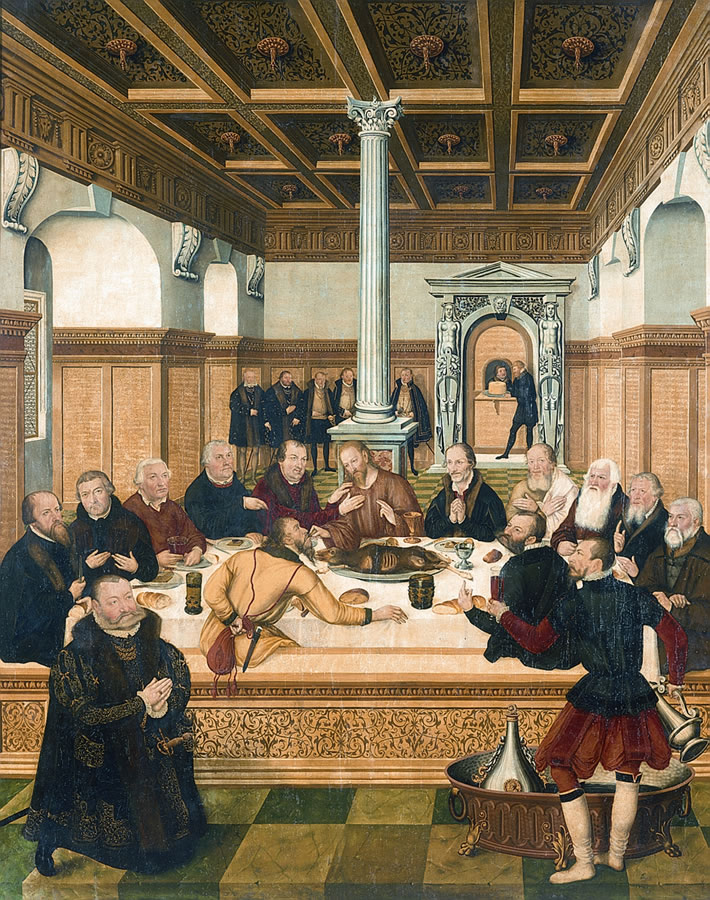
The Last Supper (1565), Johanniskirche Dessau

== Sources ==
- Kotková Olga, Cranach ze všech stran / Cranach from all sides, kat. 188 s., Národní galerie v Praze 2016, ISBN 978-80-7035-618-0
- Hamsíková Magdalena, Recepce díla Lucase Cranacha st. v malířství první poloviny 16. století v Čechách, dissertation, FF UK Prague, 2011
- Horníčková Kateřina, Šroněk Michal (eds.), Umění české reformace (1380-1620), Academia Praha 2010, s. 282–283, ISBN 978-80-200-1879-3
- Fred S. Kleiner, Gardner's Art through the Ages: The Western Perspective, Svazek 2, Cengage Learning 2009, ISBN 978-1133954804
- Royt Jan, Neznámé zobrazení luteránského námětu "Zákon a milost" v Broumově, in: Dáňová H, Klípa J, Stolárová L, Slezsko - země Koruny české. Historie a kultura 1300–1740, Národní galerie v Praze 2008, ISBN 978-80-7035-396-7
- Kotková Olga, German and Austrian Painting of the 14th - 16th Century. National Gallery in Prague, pp. 34–35, Praha 2007, ISBN 978-80-7035-358-5
- Jakubec, Ondřej a kol., Ku věčné památce. Malované renesanční epitafy v českých zemích, kat. 176 s., Muzeum umění Olomouc, 2007
- R. W. Scribner, For the Sake of Simple Folk: Popular Propaganda for the German Reformation, Cambridge University Press, 1981, pp 216–217
