= An Allegory of the Old and New Testaments =

Painting by Hans Holbein the Younger

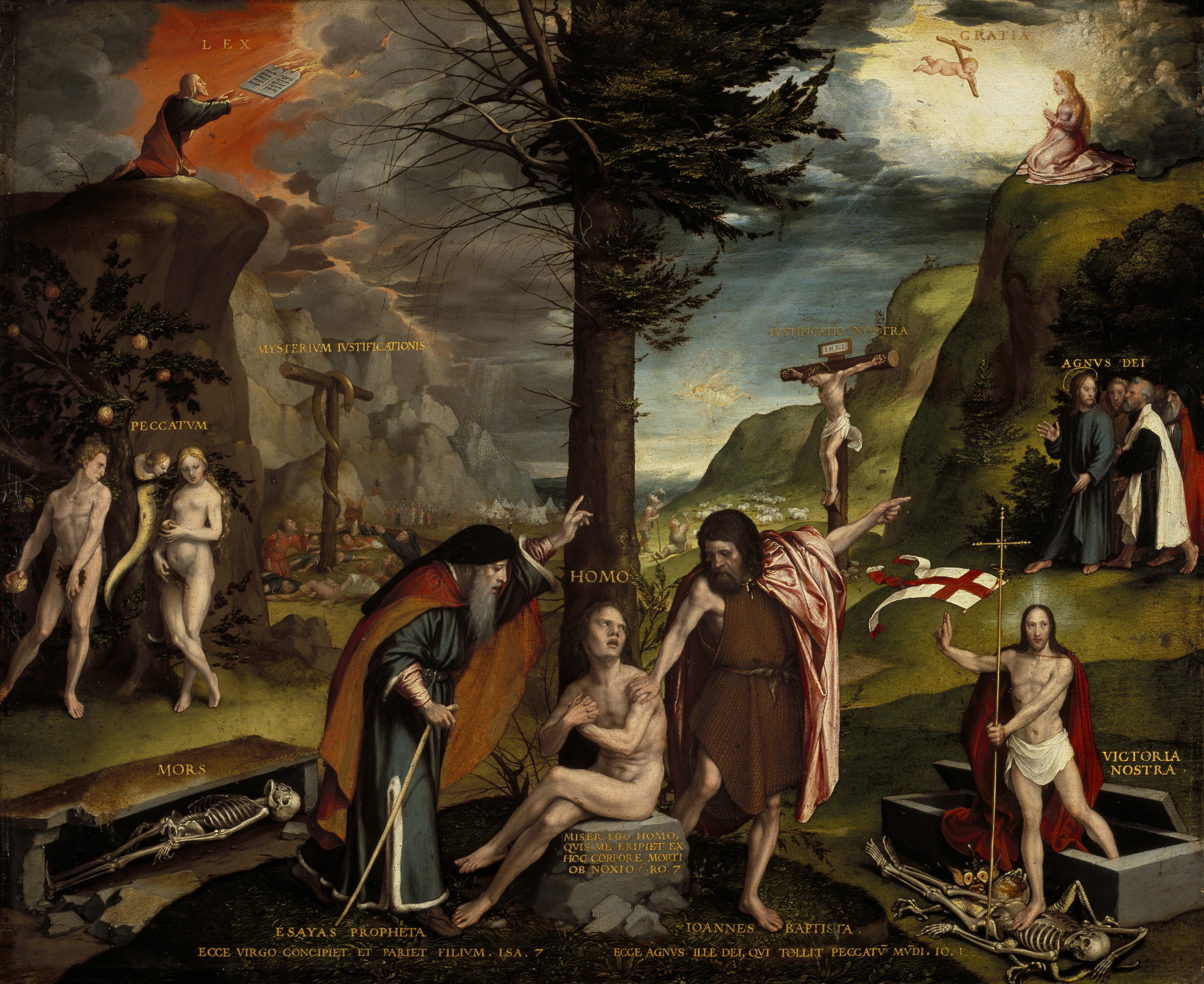
An Allegory of the Old and New Testaments (c. 1532-1536)

An Allegory of the Old and New Testaments is an allegorical and typological oil on panel painting by Hans Holbein the Younger, painted between 1532 and 1536. In 1981, the painting was acquired by the Scottish National Gallery in Edinburgh.

== Inspiration ==
It is inspired by Lucas Cranach the Elder, especially the versions of his Law and Grace now in Prague and Gotha, both produced in 1529 and both influenced by Martin Luther's teachings on justification by faith. Thanks to Cranach's productive workshop and woodcut pamphlets those works quickly spread and became representative of Lutheran doctrine. Many painters and woodcutters created copies of them and one featured as the frontispiece of the Luther Bible in 1541 and 1545, on pulpits and as architectural decoration. Allegory continues and perfects these themes.

== Description ==
The work is divided into two by a tree at the base of which sits Man (HOMO) being talked to by Isaiah (left) and John the Baptist, both pointing to Christ as his saviour as foretold by them both in the scripture passages shown below them (Isaiah 7:14 and John 1:29). That division presents the whole Bible as the story of humanity's redemption, with the New Testament fulfilling the Old. The trees' leaves on the Old Testament side are withered but those facing the New are full of life.

In the centre of the Old Testament side is the fall of man (PECCATUM - sin) above a skeleton in a tomb (MORS - death). At top left Moses receives the Tablets of the Law (LEX - law) from the hands of God atop Mount Sinai, at the base of which is the pole with the brazen serpent, a type of Christ's Crucifixion (MYSTERIUM IUSTIFICATIONIS - Mystery of Justification).

At the top right is the Annunciation to the Virgin Mary which opened the way for grace (GRATIA). Christ's birth was also announced to shepherds, as shown in the centre right background. At the right centre Christ is led to his Crucifixion as the Lamb of God (AGNUS DEI), the Crucifixion itself is also shown at the base of the right-hand cliff as "our Justification" (IUSTIFICATIO NOSTRA), and finally at bottom right Christ bursts from the tomb and tramples on a skeleton (VICTORIA NOSTRA – "our Victory").

== Interpretation ==
The two halves chosen by Holbein correspond to Protestant interpretations of the Bible, which saw the Old Testament as describing a time of sin and punishment compared to the New Testament showing the way to salvation, with Christ and his Evangelists contained as a mystery in the Old Testament and revealed in the New.

=== Vertical reading ===
This reads column by column from top to bottom. On the left God gives his law to Moses, then Adam and Eve are shown tempted from grace by the serpent, which ultimately led to death. Isaiah represents the prophets who were already announcing salvaftion. The right hand side begins with the Annunciation and divine grace, before the viewer's gaze is drawn along the beam of light to the angel announcing Christ's birth to the shepherds. On the far right edge is Christ, the Lamb of God, emerging from the shadows and making his way to his crucifixion, before finally leaving his grave, triumphing over Death and bringing about resurrection.

=== Horizontal reading ===
The artist also allowed the painting to be read from left to right:

- The grace (GRATIA) granted through the Annunciation responds to the Moses bringing the Israelites the tablets of the law (LEX);
- The shepherds at Bethlehem and the Crucifixion (Our Justification / IUSTIFICATIO NOSTRA) responds to Moses' brazen serpent (Mystery of Justification / MYSTERIUM IUSTIFICATIONIS).
- The Lamb of God (AGNUS DEI) takes away sin (PECCATUM), which came into the world through Adam and Eve
- Christ's resurrection (Our Victory / VICTORIA NOSTRA) overcomes Death (MORS).
