= Friedrich Moritz, Graf von Nostitz-Rieneck =

Friedrich Moritz, Graf von Nostitz-Rieneck (1728 – 19 November 1796, in Vienna), (Note: Also called Frederick Maurice, Graf von Nostitz-Rieneck) was a field marshal in imperial service to the House of Habsburg. His nephew, Johann Nepomuk von Nostitz-Rieneck, was a general officer in Habsburg service during the Napoleonic Wars. He was a member of the noble Nostitz family.

== Career ==
He joined the service, probably during Austria's wars with Prussia in the 1740s, and was promoted to colonel in 1759, during the Seven Years' War. On 19 February 1766, he was promoted again, to Generalmajor, and on 19 January 1771, he was promoted to Feldmarschall-Leutnant, effective 25 February 1767. On 28 March 1785, he was promoted to General der Kavallerie, and on 15 May 1796, to Field Marshal. He was Captain of the Trabanten Life Guard and the Hofburg Watch, both honorary positions from April 1785 until May 1796.

He was also president of the Aulic Council, the Imperial cabinet advising the Holy Roman Emperor on military matters. He held this position from May 1796 until his death later that year. He was also a Privy Councilor and an Imperial and Royal Chamberlain. In 1790, he received the Order of the Golden Fleece. He and several of his brothers and uncles served the Austrian monarchs as diplomatic and military advisers. In 1755 he was one of fourteen nobleman that founded the Order of Saint Joachim.
