= Weißenberg =

Weißenberg/Wóspork
- Town
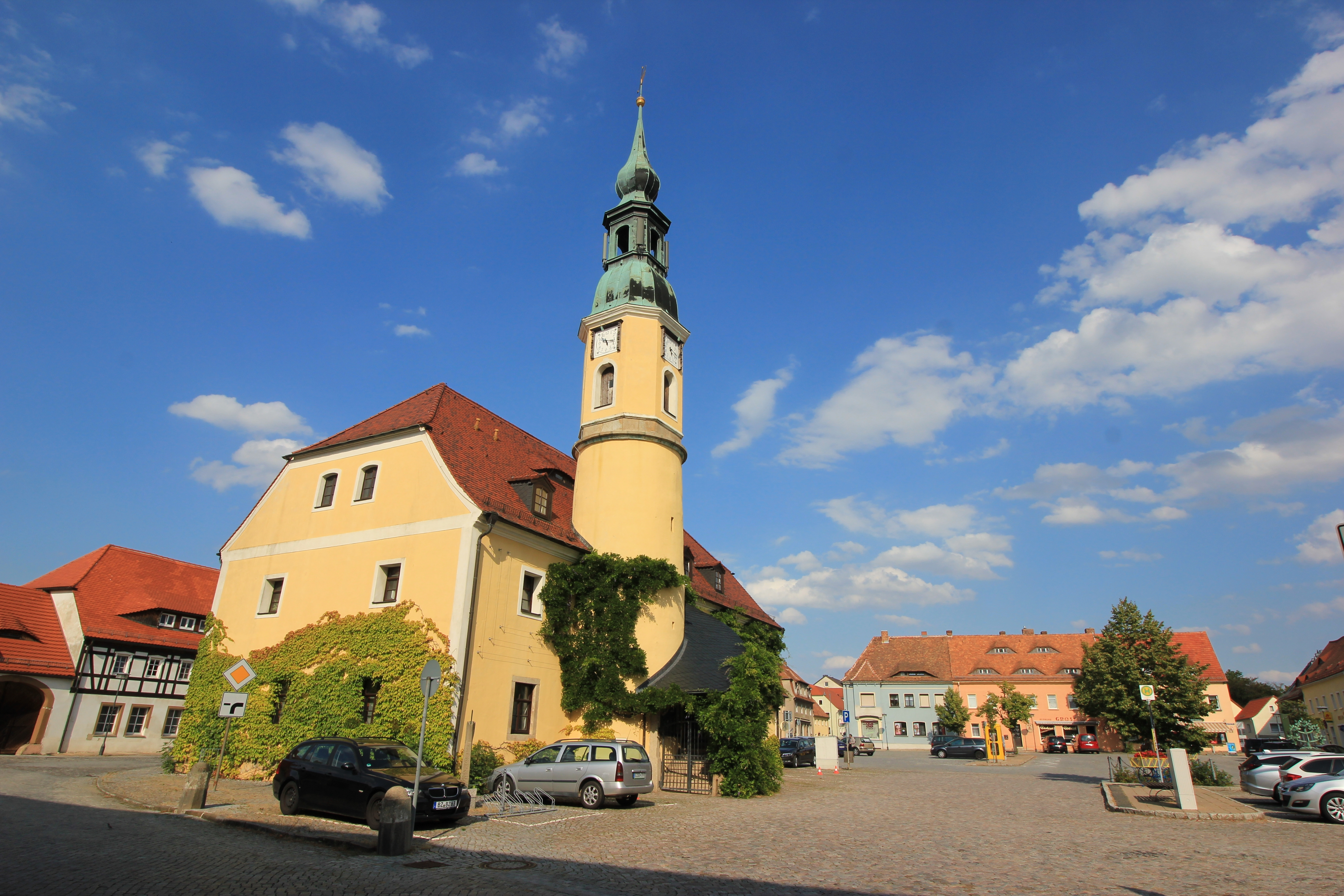
- Main square with town hall

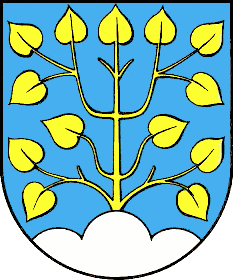
- Coat of arms

- Location of Weißenberg/Wóspork within Bautzen district
- Interactive map of Weißenberg/Wóspork
- Location within Germany Location within Saxony
- Coordinates: 51°11′49″N 14°39′34″E
- Country: Germany
- State: Saxony
- District: Bautzen
- Subdivisions: 15

Government
  - Mayor (2022–29): Jürgen Arlt

Area
  - Total: 50.96 km^{2} (19.68 sq mi)
- Elevation: 197 m (646 ft)

Population (2025-12-31)
  - Total: 3,004
  - Density: 58.95/km^{2} (152.7/sq mi)
- Demonym(s): German: Weißenberger; Upper Sorbian: Wóspor(k)čan (m.), Wóspor(k)čanka (f.)
- Time zone: UTC+01:00 (CET)
  - Summer (DST): UTC+02:00 (CEST)
- Postal codes: 02627
- Dialling codes: 035876
- Vehicle registration: BZ, BIW, HY, KM
- Website: www.stadt-weissenberg.de

Weißenberg (German, pronounced [ˈvaɪsn̩ˌbɛʁk]) or Wóspork (Upper Sorbian, pronounced [ˈwʊspɔʁk]) is a town in the district of Bautzen, in Saxony, in eastern Germany. The Upper Lusatian town has approximately 3,100 inhabitants and is part of the recognized Sorbian settlement area in Saxony.

== Geography ==
Weißenberg is located 16 km east of Bautzen/Budyšin in the region of Lusatia. The town borders Malschwitz/Malešecy and Hohendubrau in the north, Vierkirchen and Löbau in the south, and Hochkirch and Kubschütz in the west. It also borders the district of Görlitz. It's near to the border to the Czech Republic and Poland.

== Subdivisions ==
- Belgern (Sorbian Běła Hora, which means "white mountain") with Neubelgern (Nowa Běła Hora), 88 inhabitants
- Cortnitz (Chortnica), 42 inhabitants
- Drehsa (Droždźij), 234 inhabitants
- Gröditz (Hrodźišćo), 246 inhabitants
- Grube (Jama), 27 inhabitants
- Kotitz (Kotecy), 193 inhabitants
- Lauske (Łusk), 139 inhabitants
- Maltitz (Malećicy) with Wasserkretscham (Wodowa korčma), 265 inhabitants
- Nechern (Njechorń), 123 inhabitants
- Nostitz (Nosaćicy), 174 inhabitants
- Särka (Žarki), 166 inhabitants
- Spittel (Špikały), 53 inhabitants
- Weicha (Wichowy), 98 inhabitants
- Wuischke (Wuježk), 53 inhabitants
- Wurschen (Worcyn), 312 inhabitants

The actual town of Weißenberg has 977 inhabitants.

== History ==
Weißenberg was founded in 1228 at the Via Regia by Ottokar I of Bohemia and it used to be called Wizenburg, referring to the town's white castle. Along with Upper Lusatia, it passed to Hungary in 1469, then returned to Bohemia in 1490, in 1635 it passed to Electorate of Saxony.

In 1625, the town was able to buy its freedom from its noble masters for 8,500 thalers, but Weißenberg still had to accept a knightly patron.

Today's district of Wurschen is engraved on the Arc de Triomphe in Paris, since the Battle of Bautzen (1813) on May 20 and 21.

In the 18th century, Weißenberg was still mentioned as a largely Sorbian-inhabited market town, with all residents also speaking German. In the 1880s Arnošt Muka determined a population of 1242, including 300 Sorbs (24%). In 1893 the regular Sorbian services in the Weißenberg church were abolished. 1956, Ernst Tschernik counted a Sorbian-speaking population of only 5.8%, a total of 81 speakers. Today, the Sorbian community in Weißenberg is a big minority.

On April 17, 1945, the battlefield of World War II came to Weißenberg for the first time, when Soviet artillery shelled the town's train station. The following day Weißenberg was occupied by Soviet troops.

From 1952 to 1990, Weißenberg was part of the Bezirk Dresden of East Germany.

== Sights ==
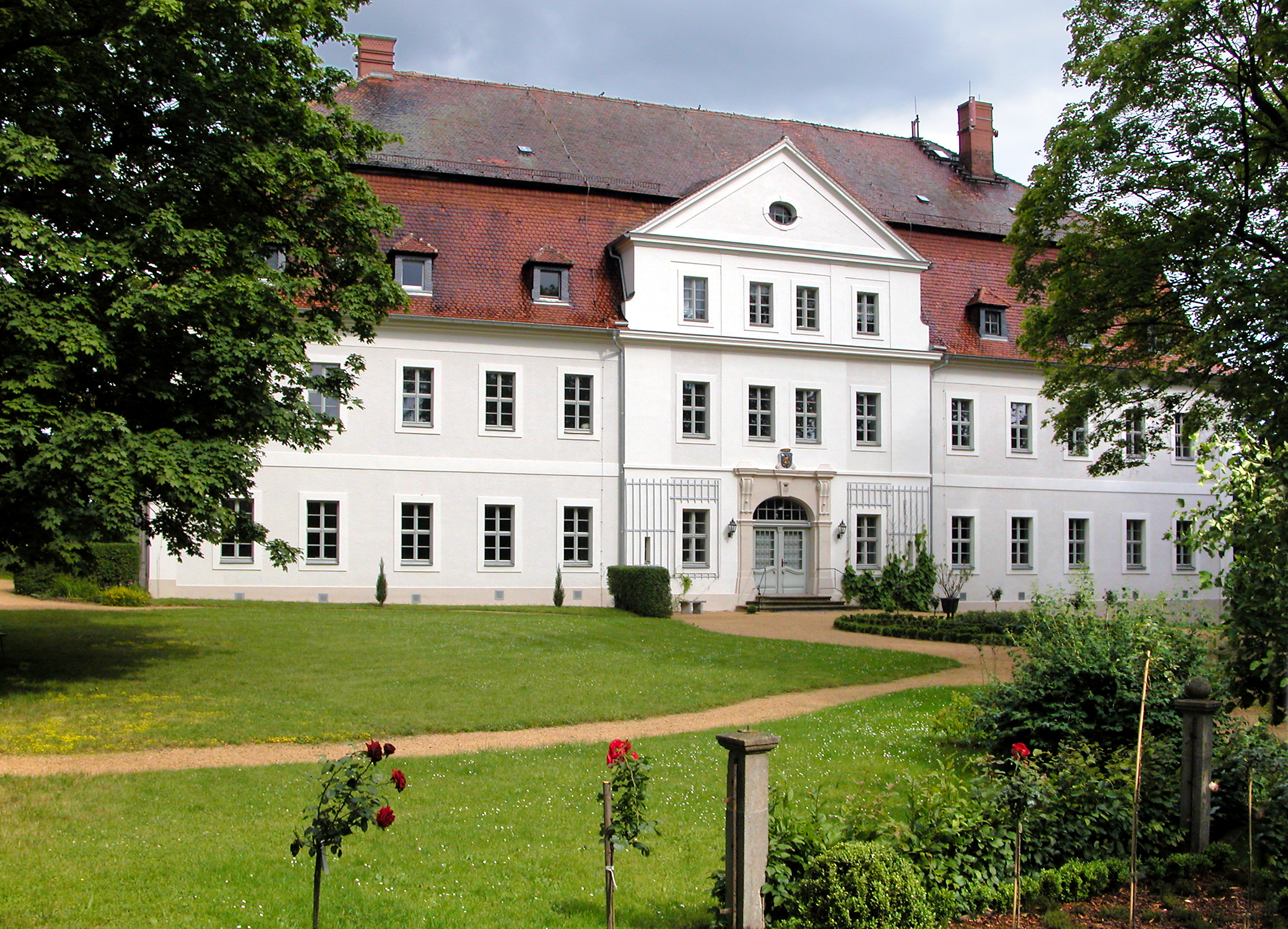
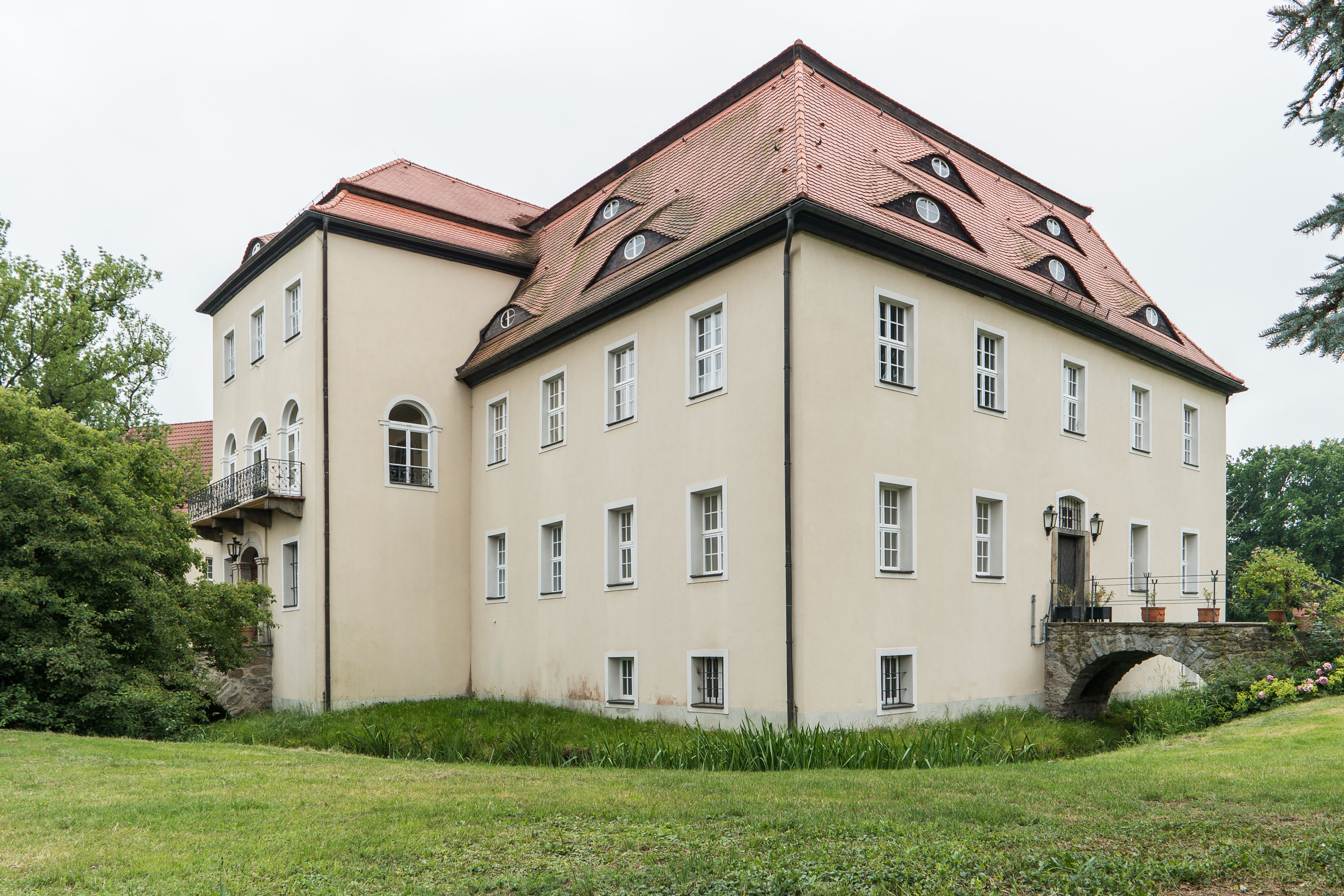
Castles of Gröditz and Wurschen
- Castle of Gröditz
- Kotitz: Evangelical church with Jan-Kilian-monument
- Riegelmühle in Nechern
- Church of Nostitz
- The museum Alte Pfefferküchlerei shows how the traditional Pfefferkuchen are made
- Castle of Wurschen

== Education ==
There are two schools in Weißenberg; a 'Grundschule' and a 'Mittelschule'.

== Notable people ==
- Pawoł Nedo (1908–1984), educator and anthropologist Sorbian, Chairman of the Domowina
- Benno von Heynitz (1924–2010), resistance fighter and lawyer, founder of Bautzen Committee e. V. and the Bautzen Memorial

== In fiction ==
In James P. Hogan's science fiction novel The Proteus Operation, Weißenberg was the location of a time machine in Nazi Germany.

== Twin towns ==
- (Germany) Deckenpfronn (1990)
