= Nostitz family =

Noble family

Original Coat of arms of the Nostitz family

The House of Nostitz (Czech: Nostic) is an old and influential Silesian aristocratic family, whose members occupied many important positions within Holy Roman Empire and later in Austria, Bohemia, Germany, and Russia.

== History ==
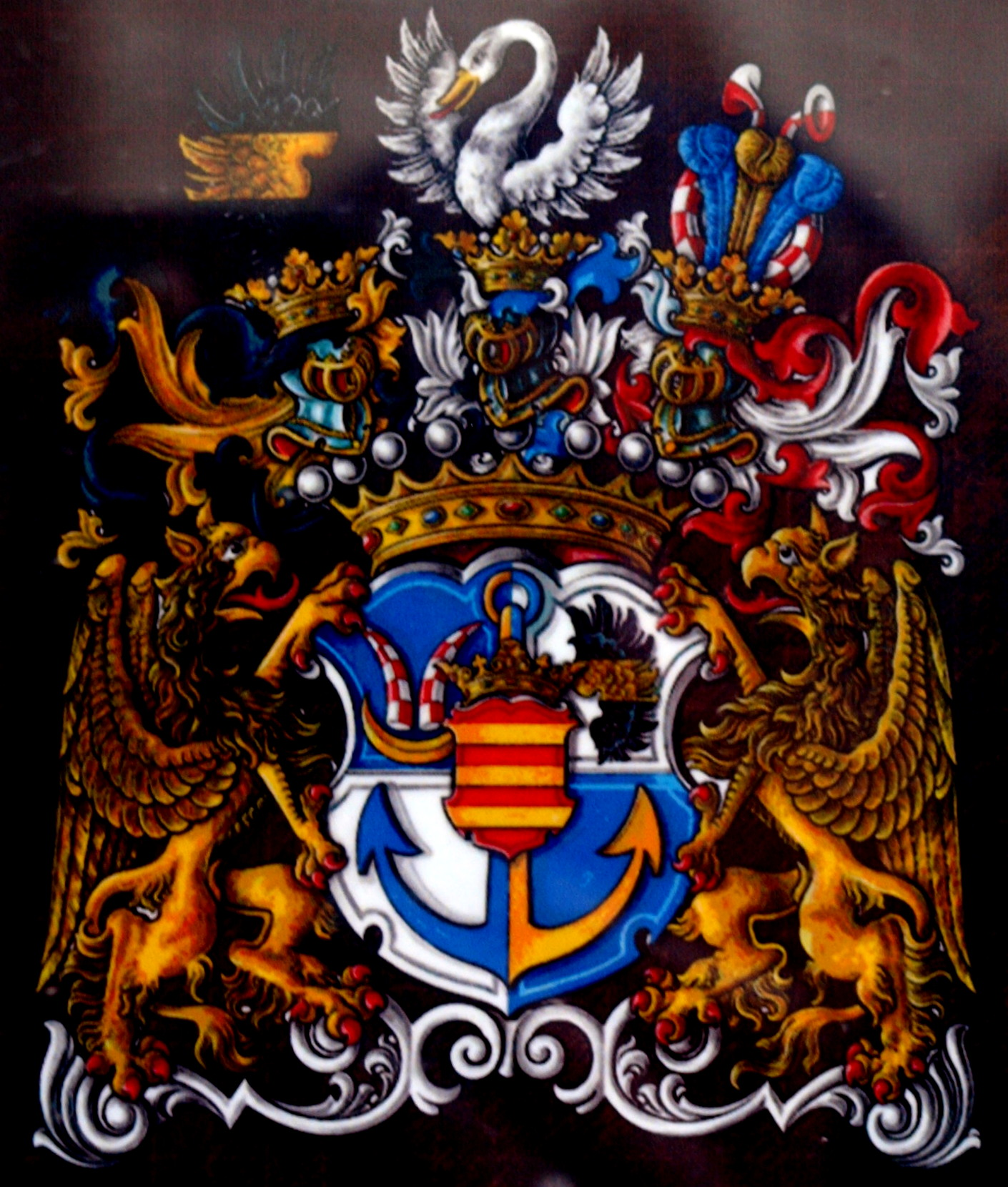
Coat of arms of the Counts of Nostitz-Rieneck

The family was named after Nostitz in Saxony, with its history dating back to 1280 in Oberlausitz, today's Germany. They sovereignly ruled over the Imperial County of Rieneck from 1673 when it was purchased by Count Johann Hartwig of Nostitz-Rieneck (1610–1683) until 1803 when they sold it to the Princes of Colloredo-Mansfeld.

Apart from Nostitz-Rieneck several other branches of the family existed: Nostitz-Rieneck-Rokitnitz, Nostitz-Unwürde, Nostitz-Jänkendorf, Nostitz-Wallwitz, Nostitz-Drzewiecky, and Nostitz-Ransen which lived and spread through Prussia, Austria, Bohemia, Poland, Lithuania and Russia.

The Nostitz-Jänkendorf branch, which held baronial or untitled noble status in Saxony, established a lineage in the Russian Empire through Lieutenant-General Georg Karl von Nostitz-Jänkendorf, whose descendants were elevated to the hereditary title of Count by an imperial decree in 1849.

== Notable members ==
- Franz Anton von Nostitz-Rieneck (1725–1794), Bohemian nobleman and patron
- Friedrich Moritz, Graf von Nostitz-Rieneck (1728–1796), a field marshal in imperial service to the House of Habsburg
- Johann Nepomuk von Nostitz-Rieneck (1768–1840), nephew of Friedrich Moritz, commanded a cavalry division in the army of the Austrian Empire during the Napoleonic Wars
- August Ludwig von Nostitz (1777–1866), Prussian general, fought in the Waterloo Campaign
- Helene von Nostitz (1878–1944), writer and salon Dame
- Georg von Nostitz (Georg Karl von Nostitz-Jänkendorf, 1781—1838), German military officer in Imperial Russian service
- Gustav-Adolf von Nostitz-Wallwitz (1898–1945), general in the Wehrmacht of Nazi Germany during World War II
- Nick Nostitz (born 1968), German photographic journalist

== Lordships ==
- 1280: earliest record of the Lords of Nostitz
- 1366: Lordship of the Holy Roman Empire
- 1631: Barony of the Holy Roman Empire
- 1673: purchased the County of Rieneck
- 1692: Counts of the Holy Roman Empire
- 1849: Counts of the Russian Empire

== See also ==
- Nostitz (disambiguation)
- Rieneck
