= Nostitz (Weißenberg) =

Coordinates: 51°09′55″N 14°40′35″E

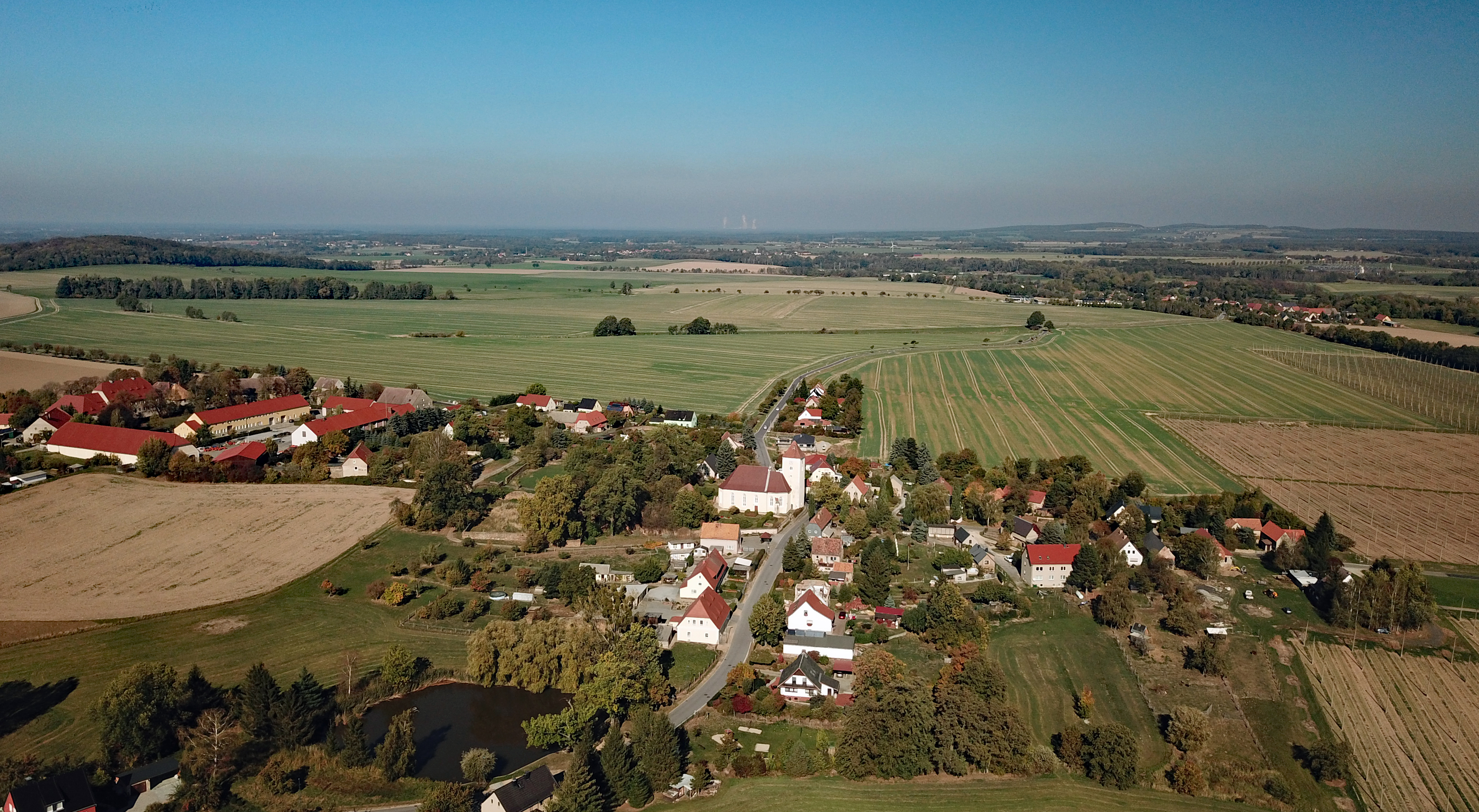

Nostitz (Upper Sorbian: Nosaćicy) is a village and a former municipality in the federal state of Saxony in Germany. It was absorbed into the town Weißenberg in 1994. The Nostitz family is named after it.

The theologian and author Adam Gottlob Schirach (1724–1773) was born in Nostitz.
