= Law and Grace (Gotha) =

Painting by Lucas Cranach the Elder

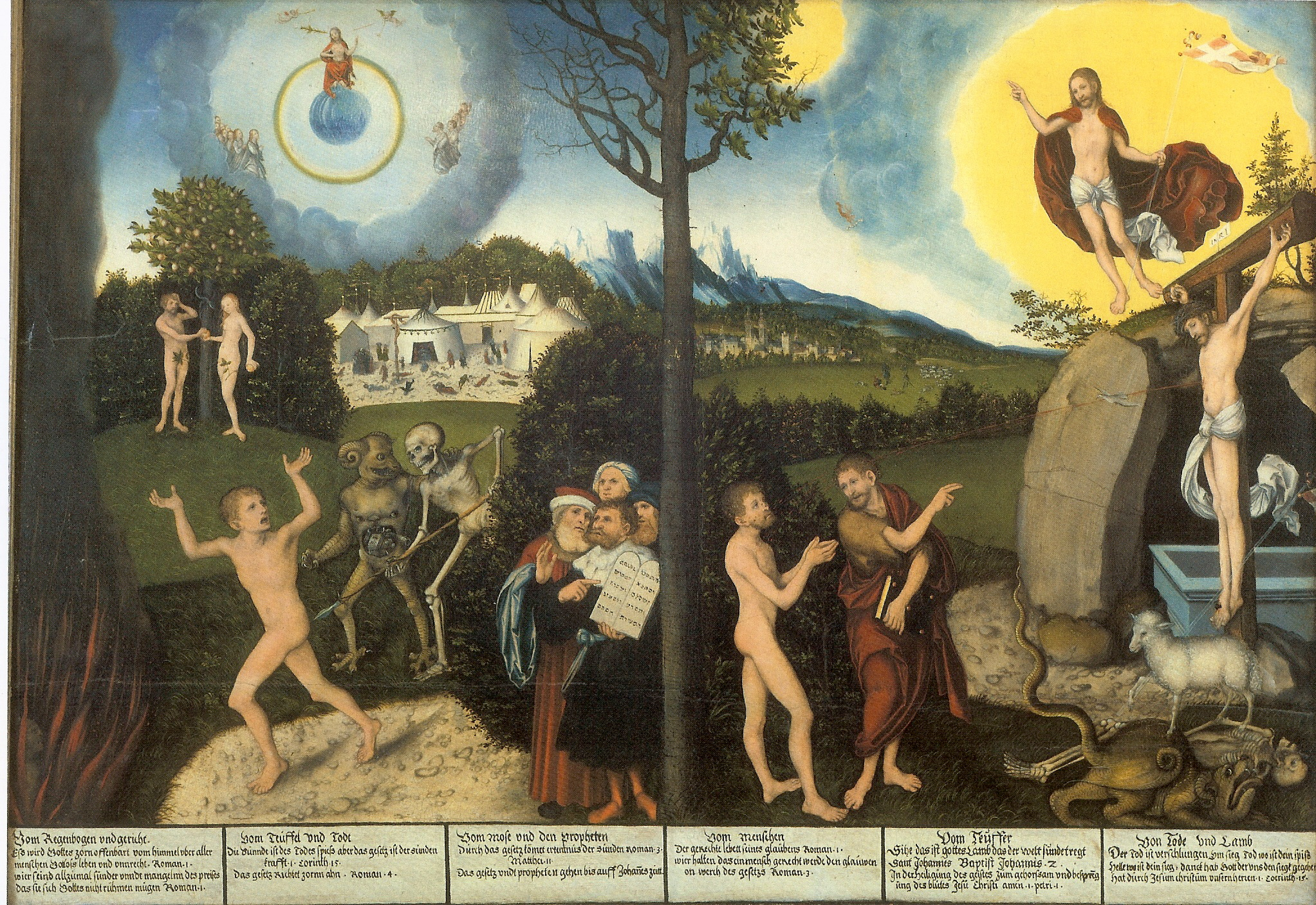
Law and Grace (1529), Gotha

Law and Grace (also The Original Sin; The Redemption of Mankind; Law and Gospel; Damnation and Salvation; The Fall and the Redemption of Mankind, The Old Testament as Lex and the New Testament as Gratia, in German: Sündenfall und Erlösung or Gesetz und Gnade, Gesetz und Evangelium) is considered one of the most important paintings by Lucas Cranach the Elder. As the second one of the early versions of the work, it is also known as ‘the Gotha type’ - the other is 'the Prague type'. Dating to 1529, it is owned by the Friedenstein Castle Foundation, Gotha (Stiftung Schloss Friedenstein Gotha) and displayed in the Ducal Museum Gotha. It differs from the Prague version above all in how both scenes are divided from each other, thus recalling the two sides of an open book.

The left-hand side portrays Christ as the ruler of the sphere and the justice of the Last Judgment with rows of supplicants on both sides. Below on Earth, a naked and defenceless man (Adam), pursued by death and the devil, is fleeing into burning hell with its heads of sinners. Moses, surrounded by prophets, strictly points a finger at the pages of the Ten Commandments and confirms the inevitability of his fate.

On the right-hand side, John the Baptist points to the naked man (Christ) on the cross as the Saviour (in the words of John's Gospel (1:29): ‘Behold, the Lamb of God, who takes away the sin of the world!’) Blood from Christ's side, bringing salvation and mingling with the dove of the Holy Spirit, spurts on to the head of the man (the concept of washing away the sins of man through the Holy Spirit, similar to the celebration of the Eucharist and baptism). The Lamb of God stands above the devil and death. The resurrected Christ rises over the cave with the empty tomb.
