= Johann Nepomuk von Nostitz-Rieneck =

Austrian general (1768–1840)

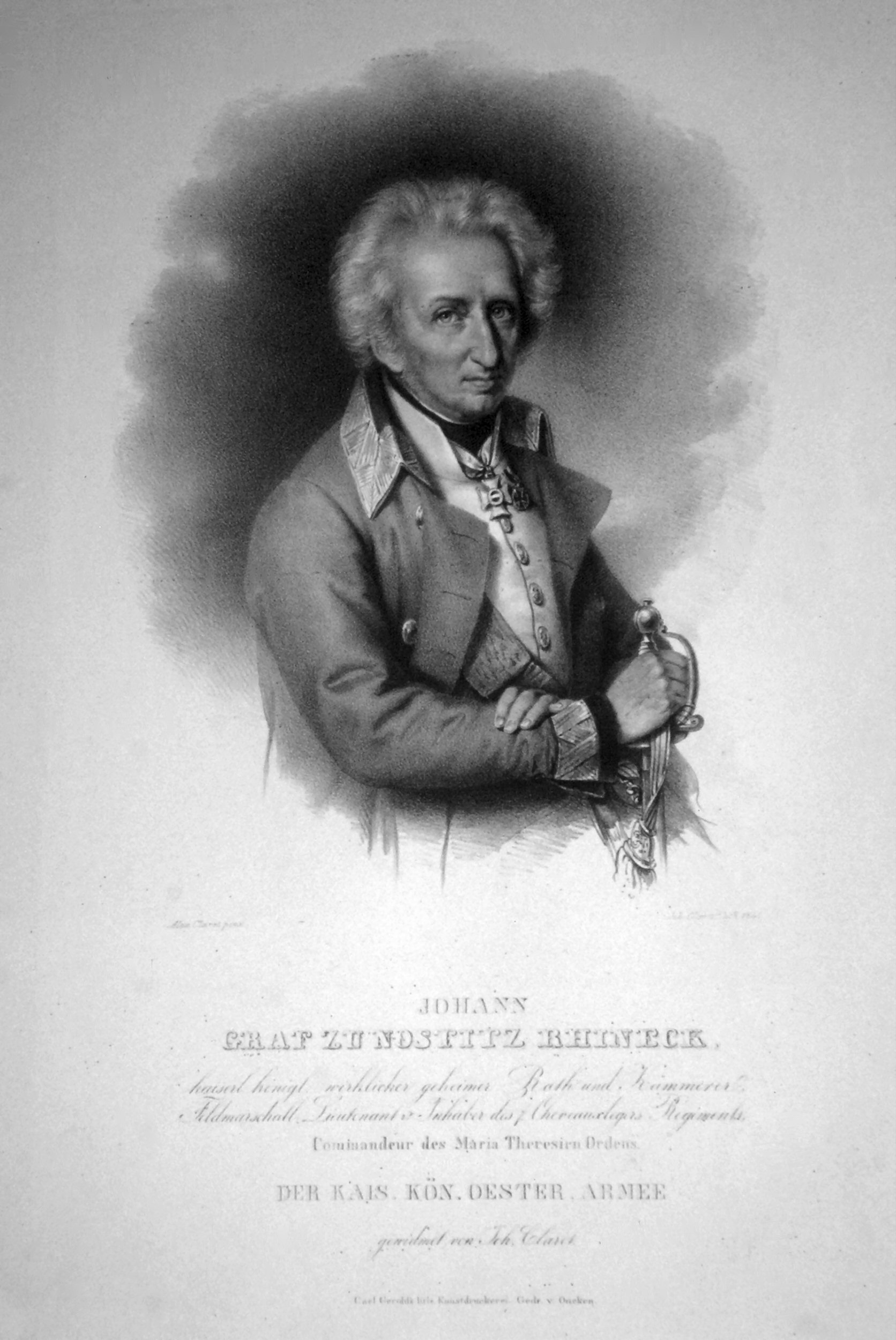
- Johann Nepomuk von Nostitz-Rieneck
- Born: 24 March 1768; Prague, Habsburg monarchy
- Died: 22 October 1840 (aged 72) Prague, Austrian Empire
- Allegiance: Austrian Empire
- Branch: Cavalry
- Service years: 1784–1821
- Rank: Feldmarschall-Leutnant
- Conflicts: See list: Austro-Turkish War (1788–1791); Siege of Belgrade; French Revolutionary Wars; Battle of Tourcoing; Battle of Handschuhsheim; Napoleonic Wars; Battle of Dürrenstein; Battle of Schöngrabern; Battle of Austerlitz; Battle of Aspern-Essling; Battle of Wagram; Battle of Dresden; Battle of Leipzig; Battle of Arcis-sur-Aube; Battle of Fère-Champenoise; Hundred Days
- Awards: Military Order of Maria Theresa; Order of St Anna, 1st class, 1815
- Other work: Inhaber, Chevau-léger Regiment Nr. 7 Privy Councillor, 1834

Johann Nepomuk von Nostitz-Rieneck (24 March 1768 – 22 October 1840) commanded a cavalry division in the army of the Austrian Empire during the Napoleonic Wars.

== Career ==
Johann Nepomuk was born on 24 March 1768 in Prague, the ninth child of Count Franz Anton von Nostitz-Rieneck (1725-1794) and Countess Marie Alžběta Krakovská z Kolowrat (1728-1815). His father was the High Burggraf of Bohemia. His father's younger brother was Friedrich Moritz von Nostitz-Rieneck, a high-ranking Austrian general who became president of the Aulic Council shortly before his death in 1796.

In 1784, he entered the Habsburg monarchy's military establishment and fought in the Austro-Turkish War. He served with distinction in the Flanders Campaign and was wounded at Tourcoing in 1794. He retired from the army at the end of 1796, but returned to military service as a general officer in late 1800.

In 1805, he led a brigade at Dürrenstein, Schöngrabern, and Austerlitz. In 1809, he fought at Aspern-Essling and led a cavalry division at Wagram. In 1813, he served at Dresden and led a division of cuirassiers at Leipzig. The following year, he fought at Arcis-sur-Aube and Fère-Champenoise. He became Proprietor (Inhaber) of a light cavalry regiment from 1814 until his death in 1840.

== Family ==
Nostitz married Countess Sofia Apraxina (b. 1778) at Karlsruhe on 27 January 1797. They had four children :

- Eduard who died in 1797 as an infant,
- Elisabeth (1799–1884),
- Karl (1801–1802),
- Adelheid (1802–1887).

Sofia died on 22 April 1802, three weeks after giving birth to Adelheid.

On 28 June 1803, Nostitz wed Gräfin Antonie Josefa Schlick von Passaun (b. 1783). She gave birth to seven children :

- Jan Nepomuk (1804?–1810),
- Ota (1804?–1821),
- Marie Philippine (1804–1876),
- Jan Josef (1805–1806),
- Albert (1807–1871), Supreme Marshal of the Kingdom of Bohemia (1861–63 , 1866–67 and 1870–71)
- Hermann (1812–1895), General of the cavalry (Austria) in 1892,
- Sigmund (1815–1890).

His second wife Antonie died on 18 August 1830.

Nostitz died at Prague on 22 October 1840.

== Notes ==
Military offices
Preceded by None	Proprietor (Inhaber) of Chevau-léger Regiment Nr. 7; 1814–1840	Succeeded by unknown
