= Law and Gospel =

Topic in Christian theology

The relationship between Law and Gospel—God's Law and the Gospel of Jesus Christ—is a major topic in Lutheran and Reformed theology. In these Protestant traditions, the distinction between the doctrines of Law, which demands obedience to God's ethical Will, and Gospel, which promises the forgiveness of sins in light of the person and work of Jesus Christ, is critical. Ministers use it as a hermeneutical principle of biblical interpretation and as a guiding principle in homiletics (sermon composition) and pastoral care. It involves the supersession of the Old Covenant (including traditional Jewish law, or halakha) by the New Covenant and Christian theology.

Other Christian groups have a view on the issue as well, or more generally views of the Old Covenant, though the matter has not usually been as hotly debated or rigorously defined as in the Lutheran and Reformed traditions.

Sometimes the issue is discussed under the headings of "Law and Grace", "Sin and Grace", "Spirit and Letter", and "ministry (διακονíα, 'diakonia') of death/condemnation" and "ministry of the Spirit/righteousness".

== Lutheran view ==
=== Martin Luther and Lutheran theologians ===
The Lutheran churches divide Mosaic Law into three components: the (1) moral law, (2) civil law, (3) ceremonial law. While the civil law (that governed Israel) was applicable to that theocracy and the ceremonial law (that prescribed the ritual for the Jews) was applicable until the arrival of Jesus, the moral law as contained in the Ten Commandments remains in force today for Christians.

A specific formulation of the distinction of Law and Gospel was first brought to the attention of the Christian Church by Martin Luther (1483–1546), and laid down as the foundation of evangelical Lutheran biblical exegesis and exposition in Article 4 of the Apology of the Augsburg Confession (1531): "All Scripture ought to be distributed into these two principal topics, the Law and the promises. For in some places it presents the Law, and in others the promise concerning Christ, namely, either when [in the Old Testament] it promises that Christ will come, and offers, for His sake, the remission of sins, justification, and life eternal, or when, in the Gospel [in the New Testament], Christ Himself, since He has appeared, promises the remission of sins, justification, and life eternal." The Formula of Concord likewise affirmed this distinction in Article V, where it states: "We believe, teach, and confess that the distinction between the Law and the Gospel is to be maintained in the Church with great diligence..."

Martin Luther wrote: "Hence, whoever knows well this art of distinguishing between Law and Gospel, him place at the head and call him a doctor of Holy Scripture." Throughout the Lutheran Age of Orthodoxy (1580–1713) this hermeneutical discipline was considered foundational and important by Lutheran theologians.

This distinction was the first article in Patrick`s Places (1528) by Patrick Hamilton.

Carl Ferdinand Wilhelm Walther (1811–1887), who was the first (and third) president of the Lutheran Church–Missouri Synod, renewed interest in and attention to this theological skill in his evening lectures at Concordia Seminary, St. Louis 1884–1885.

=== Book of Concord ===
The Formula of Concord distinguished three uses, or purposes, in the Law in Article VI. It states: "[T]he Law was given to men for three reasons ..."

1. that "thereby outward discipline might be maintained against wild, disobedient men [and that wild and intractable men might be restrained, as though by certain bars]"
2. that "men thereby may be led to the knowledge of their sins"
3. that "after they are regenerate ... they might ... have a fixed rule according to which they are to regulate and direct their whole life"

The primary concern was to maintain that the Law should continue to be used by Christians after they had been regenerated by the Holy Spirit through the Gospel to counter the doctrine of Johannes Agricola, who taught that the Law was no longer needed by regenerate Christians." Confessional Lutheranism teaches that the Law cannot be used to deny the Gospel, neither can the Gospel be used to deny God's Law. With regard to the third use of the law, the Lutheran priest Dietrich Bonhoeffer said that it functions "as God's merciful help in the performance of the works which are commanded."

The three uses of the Law are:

1. Curb – Through fear of punishment, the Law keeps the sinful nature of both Christians and non-Christians under check. This does not stop sin, since the sin is already committed when the heart desires to do what is wrong, yet it does stop the open outbreak of sin that will do even further damage.
2. Mirror – The Law serves as a perfect reflection of what God created the human heart and life to be. It shows anyone who compares his/her life to God's requirement for perfection that he/she is sinful.
3. Guide – This use of the law that applies only to Christians. The law becomes the believer's helper. Empowered by the gospel truth of forgiveness and righteousness in Christ, the believer's new self eagerly desires to live to please the Triune God.

== Reformed view ==
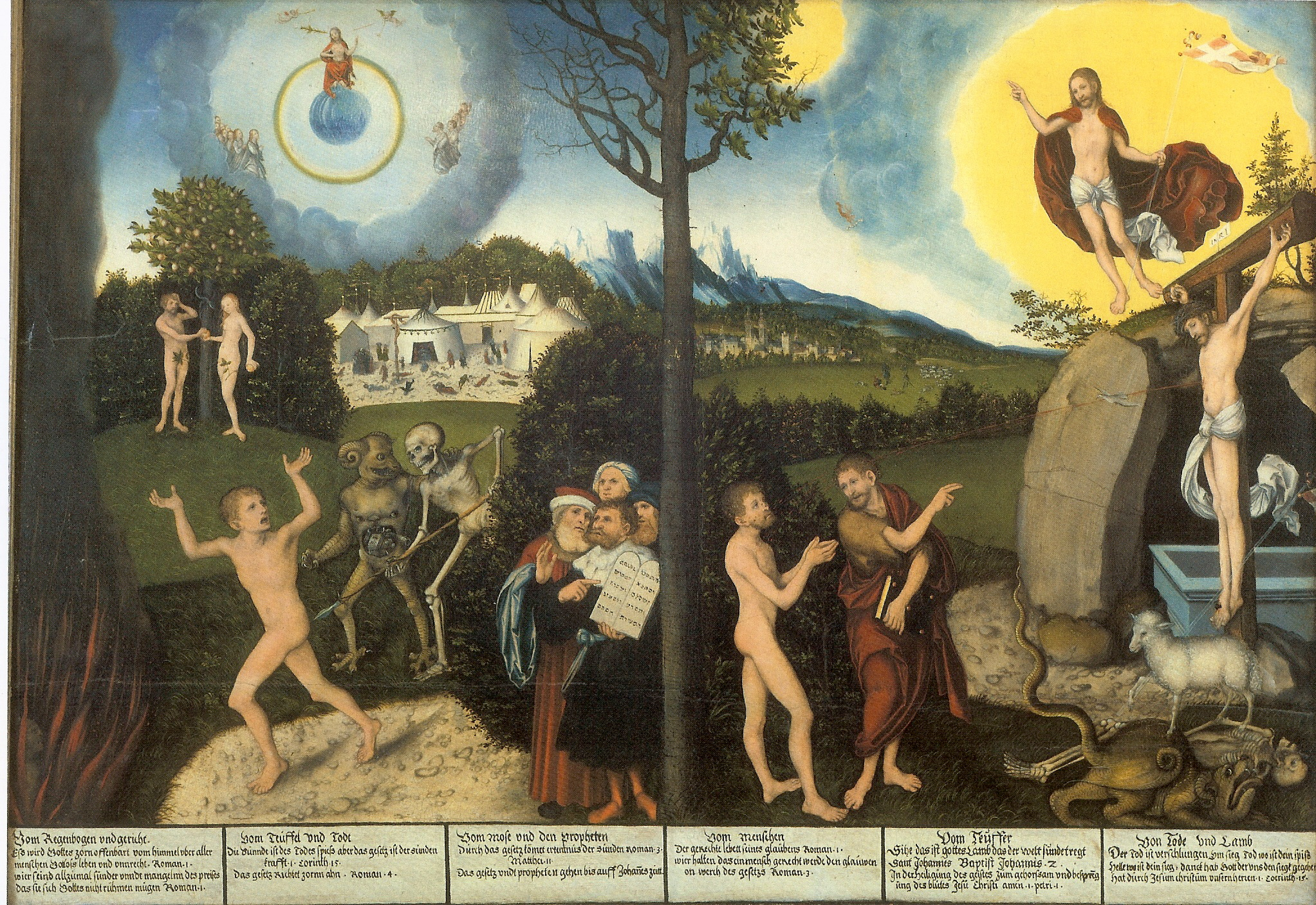
Law and Gospel, c. 1529 by Lucas Cranach the Elder, a Lutheran. The left side of the tree illustrates law, while the right side illustrates grace.

The distinction between law and gospel is a standard formulation in Reformed theology, though in recent years some have characterized it as distinctively Lutheran. Zacharias Ursinus sharply distinguished the law and gospel as "the chief and general divisions of the holy scriptures" in his commentary on the Heidelberg Catechism. Louis Berkhof called the law and the gospel "the two parts of the Word of God as a means of grace," since law and Gospel are found in both testaments.

In his 1536 book Institutes of the Christian Religion, the Reformer John Calvin distinguished three uses in the Law. Calvin wrote the following: "[T]o make the whole matter clearer, let us survey briefly the function and use of what is called the 'moral law.' Now, so far as I understand it, it consists of three parts."

1. "[W]hile it shows God's righteousness ... , it warns, informs, convicts, and lastly condemns, every man of his own unrighteousness" (2.7.6).
2. It functions "by fear of punishment to restrain certain men who are untouched by any care for what is just and right unless compelled by hearing the dire threats in the law" (2.7.10).
3. "It admonishes believers and urges them on in well-doing" (2.7.12–13).

This scheme is the same as the Formula of Concord, with the exception that the first and second uses are switched.

In later Reformed scholasticism the order is the same as for Lutherans. The three uses are called:

1. The usus politicus sive civilis, the political or civil use, is a restraint on sin and stands apart from the work of salvation. It is part of God's general revelation or common grace for unbelievers as well as believers.
2. The usus elenchticus sive paedagogicus, the elenctical or pedagogical use which confronts sin and points us to Christ.
3. The usus didacticus sive normativus, the didactic use, which is solely for believers, teaching the way of righteousness.

The Heidelberg Catechism, in explaining the third use of the Law, teaches that the moral law as contained in the Ten Commandments is binding for Christians and that it instructs Christians how to live in service to God in gratitude for His grace shown in redeeming mankind. John Calvin deemed this third use of the Law as its primary use.

== Lutheran and Reformed differences ==
Scholastic Lutheran and Reformed theologians differed primarily on the way in which the third use of the law functions for believers. The Reformed emphasized the third use (tertius usus legis) because the redeemed are expected to bear good works. The Lutheran churches teach that God rewards good works done by Christians; the Apology of the Augsburg Confession declares: "We also affirm what we have often said, that although justification and eternal life go along with faith, nevertheless, good works merit other bodily and spiritual rewards and degrees of reward. According to 1 Corinthians 3:8, 'Each will receive his wages according to his labor.'"

John Warwick Montgomery states:

Whether or not the formulation of a didactic use of the Law first appeared in Melanchthon (Helmut Thielicke [Theologische Ethik] and others have eloquently argued for its existence in Luther's own teaching; cf. Edmund Schlink, Theology of the Lutheran Confessions), there is no doubt that it became an established doctrine both in Reformation Lutheranism and in Reformation Calvinism. One finds it clearly set out in the Lutheran Formula of Concord (Art. VI) and in Calvin's Institutes (II, vii, 12 ff.). It is true that for Luther the pedagogic use of the Law was primary, while for Calvin this third or didactic use was the principal one; yet both the Lutheran and the Reformed traditions maintain the threefold conceptualization.

== Methodist view ==
John Wesley admonished Methodist preachers to emphasize both the Law and the Gospel:

Undoubtedly both should be preached in their turn; yea, both at once, or both in one. All the conditional promises are instances of this. They are law and gospel mixed together. According to this model, I should advise every preacher continually to preach the law—the law grafted upon, tempered by, and animated with the spirit of the gospel. I advise him to declare explain, and enforce every command of God. But meantime to declare in every sermon (and the more explicitly the better) that the flint and great command to a Christian is, 'Believe in the Lord Jesus Christ': that Christ is all in all, our wisdom, righteousness, sanctification, and redemption; that all life, love, strength are from Him alone, and all freely given to us through faith. And it will ever be found that the law thus preached both enlightens and strengthens the soul; that it both nourishes and teaches; that it is the guide, 'food, medicine, and stay' of the believing soul.

Methodism makes a distinction between the ceremonial law and the moral law that is the Ten Commandments given to Moses. In Methodist Christianity, the moral law is the "fundamental ontological principle of the universe" and "is grounded in eternity", being "engraved on human hearts by the finger of God." In contradistinction to the teaching of the Lutheran churches, the Methodist churches bring the Law and the Gospel together in a profound sense: "the law is grace and through it we discover the good news of the way life is intended to be lived." John Wesley, the father of the Methodist tradition taught:

... there is no contrariety at all between the law and the gospel; ... there is no need for the law to pass away in order to the establishing of the gospel. Indeed neither of them supersedes the other, but they agree perfectly well together. Yea, the very same words, considered in different respects, are parts both of the law and the gospel. If they are considered as commandments, they are parts of the law: if as promises, of the gospel. Thus, 'Thou shalt love the Lord the God with all thy heart,' when considered as a commandment, is a branch of the law; when regarded as a promise, is an essential part of the gospel-the gospel being no other than the commands of the law proposed by way of promises. Accordingly poverty of spirit, purity of heart, and whatever else is enjoined in the holy law of God, are no other, when viewed in a gospel light, than so many great and precious promises. There is therefore the closest connection that can be conceived between the law and the gospel. On the one hand the law continually makes way for and points us to the gospel; on the other the gospel continually leads us to a more exact fulfilling of the law .... We may yet further observe that every command in Holy Writ is only a covered promise. (Sermon 25, "Sermon on the Mount, V," II, 2, 3)

== Imperative and indicative ==
Certain recurring grammatical patterns in the Old Testament and in the New involving the sequencing of imperative and indicative predicates are taken by theologians as central to the relationship between Law and Gospel. Daniel Defoe discusses three pairs of these predicates in his second and final sequel to Robinson Crusoe, Serious Reflections (1720): "forbear and live", "do and live", "believe and live". According to Defoe, the first was established with Adam in paradise, the second as the Law with the children of Israel, and the third as the Gospel of Jesus Christ.

However, Luther viewed all imperative commands as law, even the command to believe the Gospel. In The Bondage of the Will he writes, "[T]he commands exist to show, not our moral ability, but our inability. This includes God's command of all men everywhere to repent and believe the gospel, an impossible act of will apart from a supernatural work of the Holy Spirit uniting us to Christ...." p. 149

== See also ==
- Antinomianism
- Calvinism
- Christian views on the Old Covenant
- Doctrine of the two kingdoms
- Expounding of the Law
- Great Commission
- Joint Declaration on the Doctrine of Justification
- Legalism
- Lutheranism
- Theonomy
- Abrogation of Old Covenant laws
