= List of Sorbian-language poets =

This is the list of poets who wrote in Upper or Lower Sorbian language.

== B ==
- Jakub Bart-Ćišinski (Łužičan, Jakub Bart Kukowski) (1856–1909)
- Jurij Brězan (1916–2006) – Upper Sorbian

== K ==
- Jurij Koch (1936–) – Upper and Lower Sorbian
- Mato Kosyk (1853–1940) – Lower Sorbian

== L ==
- Kito Lorenc (1938–2017)

== S ==
- Jan Skala (1889–1945)

== W ==
- Mina Witkojc (1893–1975) – Lower Sorbian

== Z ==
- Handrij Zejler (1804–1872)

== See also ==
- List of Sorbs
