= List of Sorbian-language writers =

This is a list of notable Sorbian Language writers.

== B ==
- Jakub Bart-Ćišinski (1856–1909)
- Jurij Brězan (1916–2006)

== D ==
- Benedikt Dyrlich (born 1950), writer, journalist and politician.

== K ==
- Jurij Koch (born 1936)
- Mato Kosyk (1853-1940)
- Marja Kubašec (1890 – 1976)

== L ==
- Kito Lorenc (1938-2017)

== S ==
- Marie Simon (1824–1877)
- Kita Fryco Stempel (1787-1867), poet.
- Bogumił Šwjela (1873–1948), pastor, editor, journalist, language scholar

== W ==
- Mina Witkojc (1893–1975)

== Z ==
- Handrij Zejler (1804–1872)

== See also ==
- List of Sorbs
- Sorbian language
- Sorbian literature
- Bible translations into Sorbian
