= Jan Arnošt Smoler =

Sorbian philologist and writer (1816–1884)

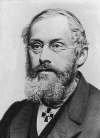
Jan Arnošt Smoler

Jan Arnošt Smoler (German: Johann Ernst Schmaler; born 3 March 1816, Merzdorf, Boxberg, Saxony – died 13 June 1884, Bautzen) was a Sorbian philologist and writer. He played a vital role in promoting the Sorbian languages in the 19th century.

== Biography ==
Jan Arnošt Smoler's father was a Protestant cantor. In 1823 he took up a position in Lohsa, where Jan Arnošt graduated from elementary school before moving to Bautzen grammar school in 1827. Although only German was taught there, Smoler acquired extensive knowledge of his native Sorbian language in private circles during his high school years.

In 1836 he began studying theology at the University of Breslau. In 1839 he finished his studies and returned to his parents' house in Lohsa for almost three years. During this time, together with Joachim Leopold Haupt and Handrij Zejler, he brought together the important Sorbian song collection “The folk songs of the Wends in Upper and Lower Lusatia”. In recognition of his services to the Wendish language, the Wendische Predigergesellschaft zu Leipzig awarded him honorary membership in 1839.

In 1847 Smoler was a co-founder of the Sorbian culture and science association Maćica Serbska. At the same time, in the context of the 1848 Revolution, he was also politically committed to the cultural rights of the Sorbian people in the German military. When Sorb troops displayed utmost loyalty to King Frederick Augustus during an 1849 revolt in Dresden, Frederick appointed Smoler as his nephew's tutor. The Saxon government made concessions to the Sorbs in this regard and 1850 Sorbian lessons were introduced in some schools. In 1850, Smoler became the first Sorbian teacher at the Bautzen grammar school. He also gave lessons at the Bautzen city school. As part of this activity, he wrote several textbooks.

In the following year, Smoler founded his own publishing bookstore in Bautzen. From 1852 he published the weekly newspaper Tydźenska nowina, from which the Serbska Nowina, which still exists today, emerged in 1854, the first editor was also Smoler. In addition, between 1852 and 1856 he published the yearbooks for Slavic literature, art, and science, which, not least of all, also achieved a high reputation among linguists abroad. From 1865 to 1868 Smoler also published the Slavic Central Gazette - a weekly for literature, art, science, and the national interests of Slavic society as a whole.

Smoler was one of the proponents of a cultural pan-Slavism and was a supporter of the theory of Slavic reciprocity. For his own small people, in particular, he hoped that cultural contacts from the great Slavic nations would stimulate and promote the Sorbian culture in the Lusatia. Between 1859 and 1883 Smoler made several trips to Russia, among other things to raise donations for the financing of his national cultural projects and the Serbski dom, the society house of Maćica Serbska. His son Marko Smoler (1857–1941) took over his publishing and editing activities in the 1870s.

Jan Arnošt Smoler died on 13 June 1884 in Bautzen. His grave is in the Protschenberg cemetery.

== Post fame ==
There is a Monument to Smoler in Bautzen.

Commemorating the 150th birthday of Jan Arnošt Smoler, a GDR postage stamp was issued in 1966.

In Lohsa, the legacy of Smolers and Handrij Zejler is nurtured in the meeting place Zejler-Smoler-Haus, which was established in 1994 in the former church school in the village where Smoler spent part of his childhood.

In 1991, the Domowina Publishing House in Bautzen re-established the Smoler’sche publishing bookstore (Sorbian: Smolerjec kniharnja). This is the only bookstore with a full range of current Sorbian literature. There is also an extensive second-hand bookshop there.

The Bautzen regional association of Domowina bears the name "Jan Arnošt Smoler".

== Works ==
- Wendish-German talks, Bautzen, 1841;
- Folk songs of the Wends in Upper and Lower Lusatia, 2nd vol. 1841 and 1843 (edited together with Leopold Haupt);
- Krotke wułpoženje powšitkomneho Serskeho prawjepisanja (Brief description of the general Wendish spelling), Bautzen, 1843;
- German-Wendish dictionary. With a representation of the general Wendish spelling, Bautzen, 1843;
- Remains of ancient mythology in the Wendish Lausitz, 1848;
- Sorbian-Wendish language teaching, Bautzen, 1850;
- A short grammar of the Serbian-Wendish language in Upper Lusatia, Bautzen, 1852;
- The Slavic place names in Upper Lusatia and their meaning. Festschrift for the 300th anniversary of the Budissin grammar school, Bautzen, 1867;
- Fonts published by Smoler (selection);
- Eduard Rüffer: The Balkan Peninsula and its peoples before the solution of the oriental question: A political-ethnographic-military sketch, 1869;
- P. Broniš: The Slavic family names in Lower Lusatia, 1867;
- Karl August Jentsch: History of the Lausitzer Predigergesellschaft zu Leipzig and a list of all its members from 1716 to 1866, 1867;
- Christian Traugott Pfuhl: Phonology and form theory of the Upper Lusatian-Wendish language. With special consideration for Old Slavonic, 1867;
- Christian Traugott Pfuhl, Handrij Zejler: Lusatian Wendish dictionary, 1866;
- Slavisches Centralblatt: weekly for literature, art, science, and national interests of general slavery. (Journal 1865/1866);
- Central sheet for Slavic literature and bibliography. (Journal 1867/1868);
- Journal of Slavic Literature, Art and Science;
- Alexander Hilferding: Bosnia, 1858;
- Alexander Hilferding: The linguistic monuments of the Drevjan and Glinjan Elbslaven in the Lüneburg Wendland, 1857;
- Yearbooks for Slavic literature, art, and science 1852–1856.

== See also ==
- Jakub Bart-Ćišinski (1856–1909) - Poet, writer, playwright, and translator
- Jan Kilian (1811–1884) - Pastor and leader of the Sorbian colony in Texas
- Korla Awgust Kocor (1822–1904) - Composer and conductor
- Ludwig Leichhardt (1813–1848) - Explorer and naturalist
- Handrij Zejler (1804–1872) - Writer, pastor, and national activist
- Jurij Brězan (1916–2006) - Writer, novelist, and author of children's books
- Jurij Koch (born 1936) - Writer, editor, and reporter
- John Symank (1935–2002) - Head coach for Northern Arizona University and the University of Texas at Arlington football teams
- Mato Kosyk (1853–1940) - Poet and minister
- Kito Lorenc (1938–2017) - Writer, lyric poet, and translator
- Pavle Jurišić Šturm (1844–1922) - General serving in the Serbian military during World War I
- Erwin Strittmatter (1912–1994)
- Stanislaw Tillich (born 1959)
- Mina Witkojc (1893–1975)

== Literature ==
- Peter Kunze: Jan Arnošt Smoler. A life for his people. In: Writings of the Sorbian Institute Volume 10. 1st edition, Domowina-Verlag, Bautzen 1995. ISBN 3-7420-1624-5 (Sorbian: Pětr Kunze: Štóž swoju narodnosć z česću zańdźe. * Nadźije a skutki Jana Arnošta Smolerja. In: Wobrazki ze Serbow 1. nakł. Ludowe Nakł. Domowina, Budyšin 1995. ISBN 3-7420-1637-7).
- Peter Kunze: Smoler, Jan Arnošt. In: New German Biography (NDB). Volume 24, Duncker & Humblot, Berlin 2010, ISBN 978-3-428-11205-0, pp. 512–514 (digitized version).
- Arthur Lier Hermann, Johann Ernst Schmaler. In: Allgemeine Deutsche Biographie (ADB). Volume 31, Duncker & Humblot, Leipzig 1890, pp. 617–619.
