= List of Sorbs =

At about a population of 60,000 (30,000 of which speak Sorbian), the Sorbs are the smallest Slavic-speaking group in Europe.

This is a list of notable Sorbs.

== Historical ==
- Czimislav (839–840) – 9th-century King of the Sorbs
- Jakub Bart-Ćišinski (1856–1909) – Poet, writer, playwright, and translator
- Jan Kilian (1811–1884) – Pastor and leader of the Sorbian colony in Texas
- Korla Awgust Kocor (1822–1904) – Composer and conductor
- Ludwig Leichhardt (1813–1848) – Explorer and naturalist
- Jan Arnošt Smoler (1816–1884) – Philologist and writer
- Handrij Zejler (1804–1872) – Writer, pastor, and national activist
- Pavle Jurišić Šturm, born Paulus Eugen Sturm (1848–1922) – General in the Serbian Army

== Contemporary ==
- Jurij Brězan (1916–2006) – Writer, novelist, and author of children's books
- Martha Israel (1905–c. 1967) – member of the Volkskammer
- Jurij Koch (b. 1936) – Writer, editor, and reporter
- John Symank (1935–2002) – Head coach for Northern Arizona University and the University of Texas at Arlington football teams, defensive back in the NFL, and player for the University of Florida
- Mato Kosyk (1853–1940) – Poet and minister
- Baldur von Schirach (1907–1974) – Nazi German politician and convicted war criminal
- Kito Lorenc (1938–2017) – Writer, lyric poet, and translator
- Kurt Krjeńc (1907–1978) – East German politician and Chairman of Domowina
- Marie Simon (1824–1877) – nurse
- Erwin Strittmatter (1912–1994)
- Stanislaw Tillich (b. 1959)
- Mina Witkojc (1893–1975)
- Carolina Eyck (b. 1987)
- Margot Robbie (b. 1990), Australian actress of Scottish, German and Sorb heritage.
- Peter Schowtka (1945–2022) – member of the Landtag of Saxony
- Eva Ursula Lange (1928–2020) – painter, illustrator, graphic designer, and ceramist

== See also ==
- Sorbs
