= Sorbian literature =

Literary texts written in the Sorbian language

Flag of the Sorbs

Sorbian literature refers to the literature written by the Western Slavic people of Central Europe called the Sorbs in Sorbian languages (Upper Sorbian language and Lower Sorbian language).

Sorbian literature began with the Reformation and the translations of religious texts. The first translation of the New Testament was made in 1549 by M. Jakubica and the first printed book in 1574 was Albin Moller's Zpevnik a Katechism (hymnal and catechism). See also Bible translations into Sorbian.

The British Library houses many copies of early Sorbian literature, the earliest being a copy of the Lord's Prayer dating from 1603. Sorbian is also noted in one of the first multilingual dictionaries: Megiser's Thesaurus Polyglottus, published in Frankfurt in 1603. Around twenty books were available by 1700, mostly about religion.

Little from that early period has survived. Much Sorbian literature was housed in a library in Dresden and destroyed during the Bombing of Dresden during World War II.

Jurij Brězan published books both in Upper Sorbian and German and Jurij Koch in Lower Sorbian and German.

== Sorbian Poetry ==
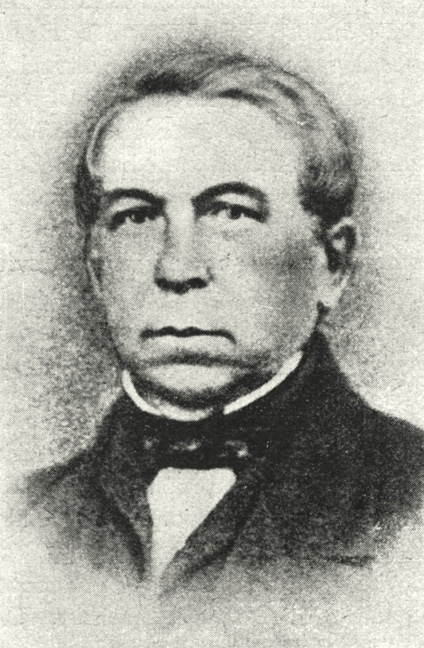
Handrij Zejler

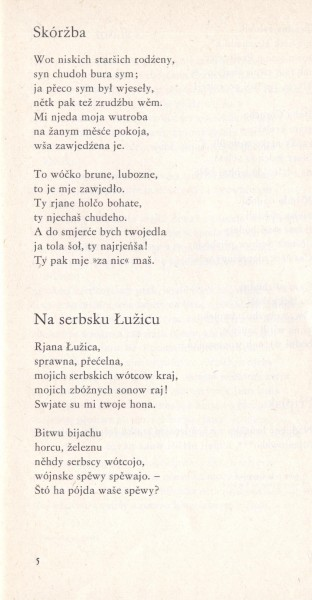
One of Handrij Zejler's poems

Sorbian poetry flourished in the late 1800s with one of the most notable poets being Handrij Zejler, who published between 1883 and 1891.

== Sorbian Journals ==
The longest running of various Sorbian journals is called the Casopis Macicy Serbskeje, published between 1848 and 1918.

== List of writers ==
- List of Sorbian-language writers
- List of Sorbian-language poets
