= Serbo-Lusatian =

Serbo-Lusatian may refer to:

- Serbo-Lusatian languages (Sorbian languages)
- Serbo-Lusatians (Sorbs)
