= Handrij Zejler =

Sorbian Lutheran pastor and writer (1804–1872)

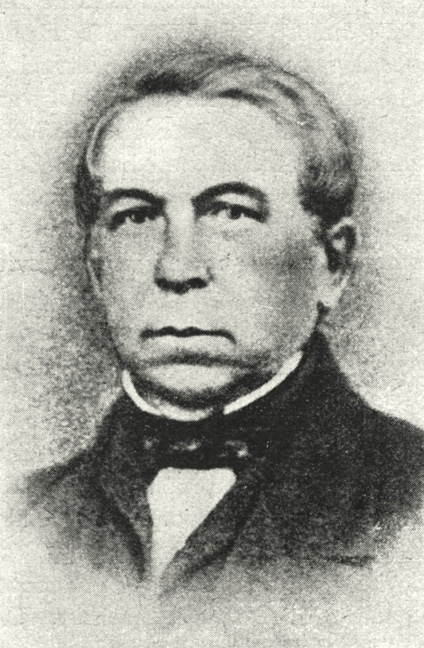
Handrij Zejler

Handrij Zejler (1 February 1804 – 15 October 1872; official German name Andreas Seiler) was a Sorbian writer, Lutheran pastor and national activist. He co-founded the Lusatian cultural and scientific society Maćica Serbska.

== Biography ==
Zejler was born on 1 February 1804 in Słona Boršć (German: Salzenforst), now a part of Budyšin (Bautzen).

He was an author of popular religious, love and patriotic poems, as well as the Sorbian national anthem Rjana Łužica, linguistic works, publicist works, ballads, satires and fables. He died on 15 October 1872 in Łaz (Lohsa) near Wojerecy (Hoyerswerda).

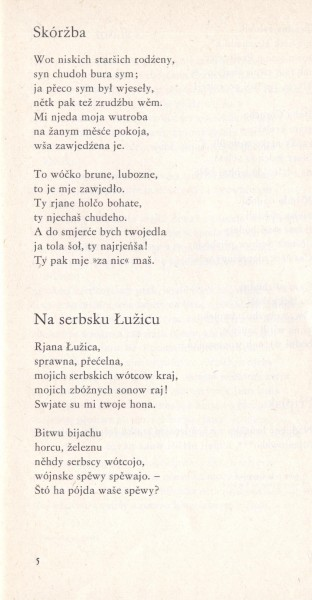
One of his poems

Zejler is seen today as one of the founders of Sorbian national literature.

== Memory ==
His name bears the State Prize of the Ministry of Science and Art of the Federal State of Saxony.

== See also ==
- Jakub Bart-Ćišinski (1856–1909) - Poet, writer, playwright and translator
- Jan Kilian (1811–1884) - Pastor and leader of the Sorbian colony in Texas
- Korla Awgust Kocor (1822–1904) - Composer and conductor
- Ludwig Leichhardt (1813–1848) - Explorer and naturalist
- Jan Arnošt Smoler (1816–1884) - Philologist and writer
- Jurij Brězan (1916–2006) - Writer, novelist and author of children's books
- Jurij Koch (born 1936) - Writer, editor and reporter
- John Symank (1935–2002) - Head coach for Northern Arizona University and the University of Texas at Arlington football teams, defensive back in the NFL, and player for the University of Florida
- Mato Kosyk (1853–1940) - Poet and minister
- Kito Lorenc (1938–2017) - Writer, lyric poet and translator
