= Rjana Łužica =

National anthem of Lusatia by Handrij Zejler

Rjana Łužica Rědna Łužyca
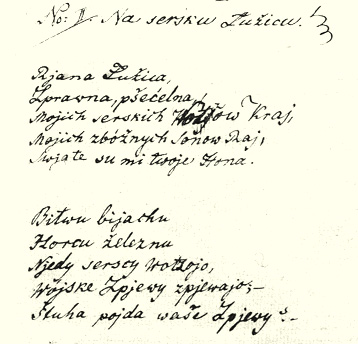
- Handwritten copy of the lyrics.
- anthem of Lusatia
- Also known as: (English: National Anthem of Sorbia) (English: Our Sorbia)
- Lyrics: Handrij Zejler
- Music: Korla Awgust Kocor, 1845

"Rjana Łužica" (Lower Sorbian: Rědna Łužyca; lit. “Beautiful Lusatia”) is the Sorbian national anthem. It was written by poet Handrij Zejler. The lyrics were firstly published on August 24, 1827, in the Leipzig magazine Serbska Nowina. Its music was composed in the beginning of 1845 by Korla Awgust Kocor (German: Karl August Katzer). The anthem was publicly performed for the first time on October 17, 1845, in Budyšin/Bautzen (Upper Sorbian Budyšin, Lower Sorbian: Budyšyn), German Bautzen, formerly Budissin).

== Lyrics ==
Upper Sorbian	Lower Sorbian	English*
Rjana Łužica, sprawna, přećelna, mojich serbskich wótcow kraj, mojich zbóžnych sonow raj, swjate su mi twoje hona! Časo přichodny, zakćěj radostny! Ow, zo bychu z twojeho klina wušli mužojo, hódni wěčnoh wopomnjeća!	Rědna Łužyca, spšawna, pśijazna, mojich serbskich woścow kraj, mojich glucnych myslow raj, swěte su mě twoje strony. Cas ty pśichodny, zakwiś radostny! Och, gab muže stanuli, za swoj narod źěłali, godne nimjer wobspomnjeśa!	Lusatia, beautiful, Gracious, dutiful, Land of Sorbian forebears’ toil, Land of dreams, resplendent soil, Sacred are to me thy pastures. May thy future be Blooming joyously! Oh, may from thy womb appear People that the world holds dear, Worthy of eternal memory!

Handrij Zejler's two additional verses have been excluded from the official version.

Upper Sorbian	English*
Bitwu bijachu, horcu, železnu, něhdy serbscy wótcojo, wójnske spěwy spěwajo. Štó nam pójda waše spěwy? Boha čorneho, stare kralestwo rapak nětko wobydli, stary moch so zeleni, na skale, kiž wołtar běše.	Battles hotly fought, Wars of iron wrought, Our forebears proudly sang. Words of war songs loudly rang. Who will now tell us their stories? Once the black god’s land, Ancient creed’s last stand, Now a raven’s perch is there, Ancient moss on rocks once bare, Altars for our forebears’ worship.
