= Albin Moller =

German writer and astrologer

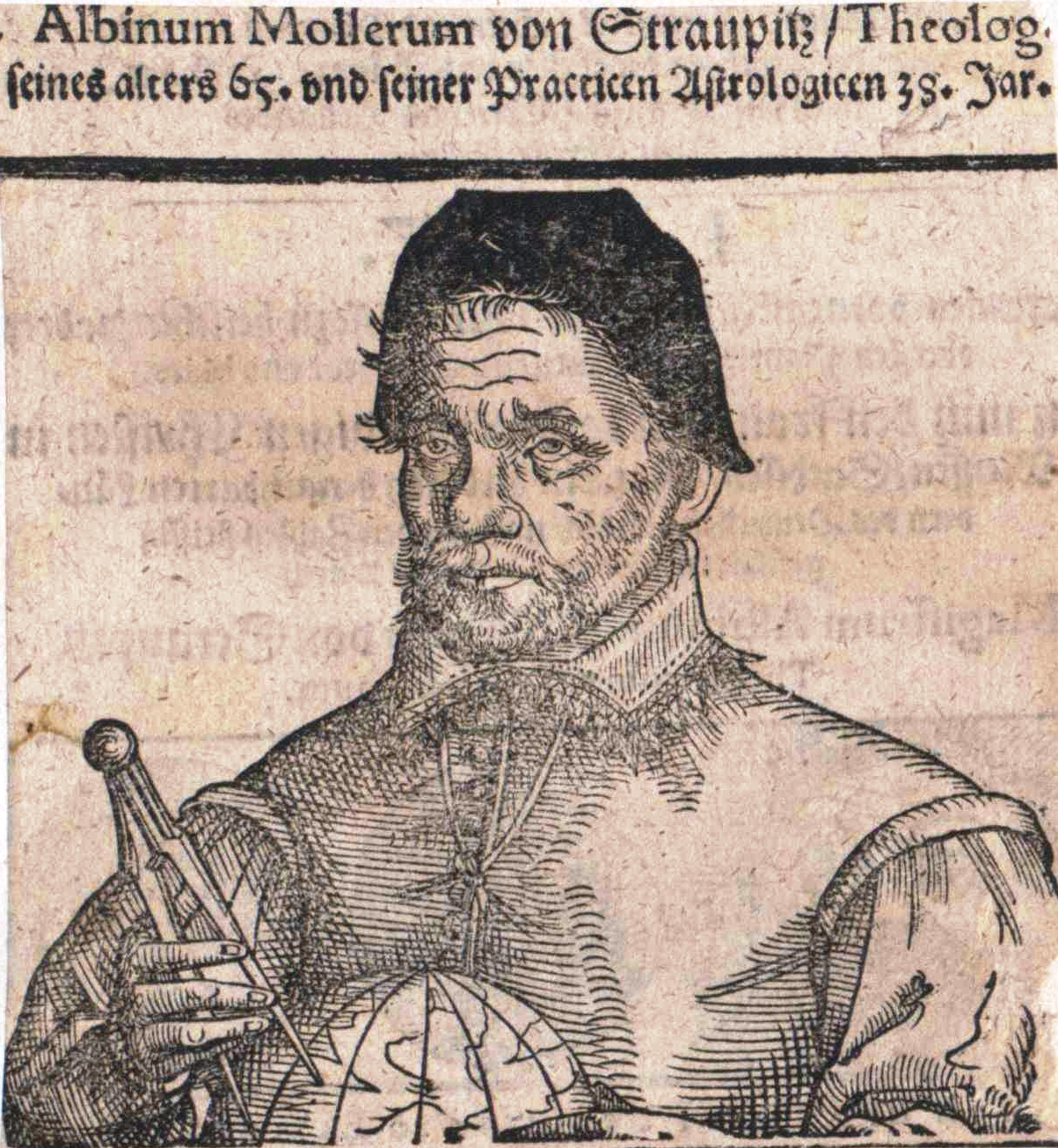
Albin Moller.

Albin Moller was a Sorbian author, astrologer, and translator who lived in eastern Germany during the late 16th and early 17th centuries.

== Life and career ==
Moller was born in Straupitz, and worked there as a pastor. He died in Altdöbern.

== Astrological works ==
In 1596, Moller published Die grosse: Practica Astrologica, a guide to astrology. In 1602, he published Fleissig und Getrewlich Gestellet, an astrological calendar, in Leipzig. The title page features a woodcut of Moller at age sixty. He published another calendar, Alt und New Schreibcalender Auff das Jar nach unsers Herrn Jhesu Christi Geburt MDCI, around 1600.

== Other works ==
Moller translated the Lutheran hymn book Hymnal and catechism into the Lower Sorbian language in 1574, the first book to be printed in the language. He published Die Pflanzen der Arzneikräuter-Liste von (List of Medicinal Plants and Herbs) in 1582.
