= Protschenberg =

Hill in Germany

Coordinates: 51°11′06″N 14°25′02″E

Protschenberg Hrodźiško
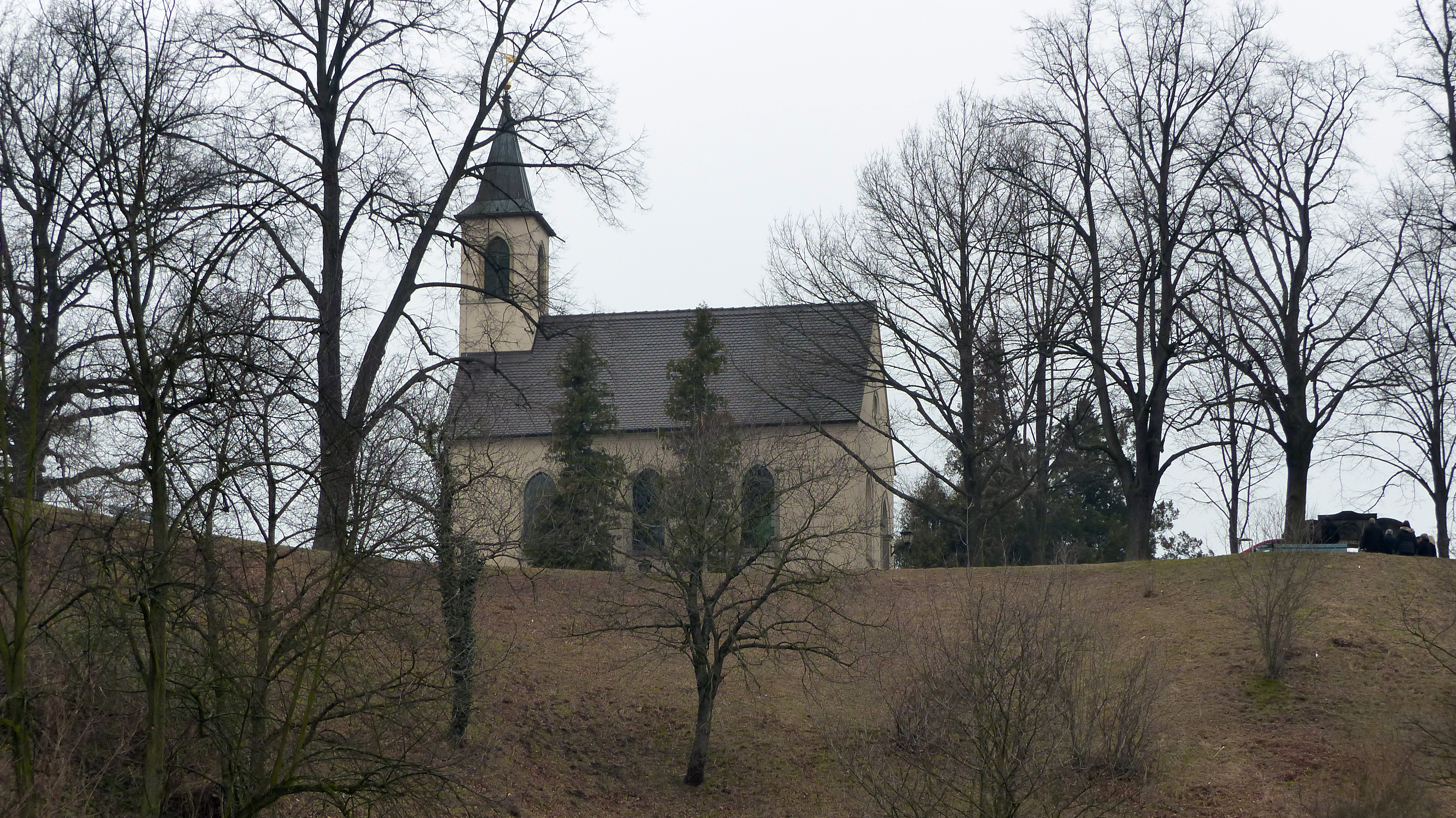
- The chapel on the Protschenberg/Hrodźiško, in 2015

Geography
- Location: Saxony, Germany

The Protschenberg (German) or Hrodźiško (Upper Sorbian) is a hill in Bautzen in the state of Saxony, eastern Germany.
