= Mato Kósyk =

Sorbian-American poet (1853–1940)

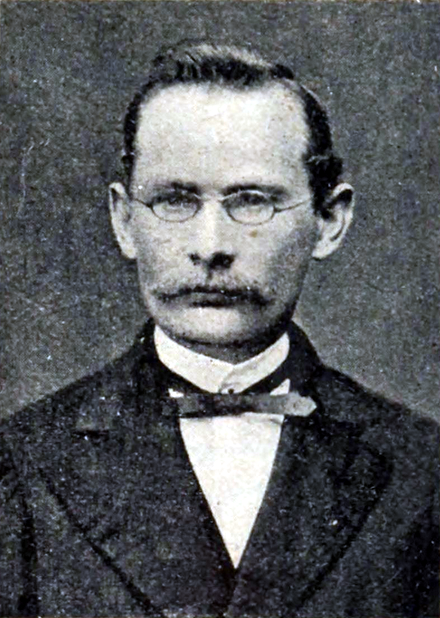
Mato Kósyk (1852–1940)

Mato Kósyk (18 June 1853 – 22 November 1940) was a German-American minister and Sorbian language poet. He was born in Werben, Prussia, emigrated from Lower Lusatia to the United States, and died at his rural home near Albion, Oklahoma.

== Youth ==
Kósyk began his schooling at the gymnasium in Cottbus in 1867, with the intention of studying theology. He left the gymnasium before graduation in 1873, bringing his study ambitions to a temporary end. Instead, he started working for a Leipzig railroad company, where he wrote his first lyrical texts. These were all written in Lower Sorbian.

=== Literary activities ===
Because of problems with his health, Kósyk returned to Werben in 1877. During the following years he made a living as a freelance writer and produced his most important poetic works. From 1880 onwards he was co-editor of the Bramborske nowiny (Brandenburg News). Through his involvement in the revision of the Lower Sorbian church hymnal he made a lasting impact on the Lower Sorbian language.

Kósyk maintained contacts with practically all important representatives of Sorbian cultural life: Kito Šwjela, Hajndrich Jordan, Bjarnat Krušwica, Juro Surowin and Alfons Parczewski, as well as Michał Hórnik and Jan Arnošt Smoler. Kósyk was one of the founders of the Lower Sorbian Maśica Serbska, the most important organisation of Lower Sorbian culture.

== Emigration ==
In October 1883, Kósyk left for Hamburg, from where he sailed to New York City. He traveled by way of Buffalo, New York, to Springfield, Illinois. Here he could fulfill his dreams to study theology, and he enrolled in an orthodox Lutheran theological seminary. In January 1884 however, he transferred to a German seminary in Chicago, Illinois, instead, and continued his studies in a liberal Lutheran direction. Moreover, the students there spoke German instead of English, making it much easier for Mato Kosyk to understand. He completed his studies in 1885 and was ordained in Wellsburg, Iowa, where he worked among German Frisian immigrants. Although Kósyk worked in the United States among German- and Frisian-speaking farmers, he never ceased to write his Sorbian tales and poems during this period. He continued to publish in Sorbian publications.

=== Temporary return ===
At the end of 1886 Mato returned to Lower Lusatia when his brother Kito died. It appears his return was made easier because of tensions between the congregation in Wellsburg and himself. After returning, Kósyk endeavoured to have his ordination recognized; he very much wanted to fill a vacancy in Drachhausen near Peitz. His efforts were in vain, however, and he traveled back to the United States in 1887.

== America ==
In 1887 Kósyk again traveled to the United States, and he never again returned to Europe. He found work as a pastor in Nebraska, where he worked in several German-language congregations until 1907: Ridgeley in Dodge County (1887–1889), Princeton in Lancaster County (1889–1895), Stamford in Harlan County (1896–1899) and Ohiowa in Fillmore County (1899–1907). From autumn 1895 until summer 1896 he was out of work and lived in Roca in Lancaster County. Kósyk married Anna Wehr in Princeton in 1890. Anna came from Duszno (formally Hochberg, now part of Trzemeszno), a village in Kreis Gnesen in the Province of Posen. Kósyk's last position was in El Reno, Oklahoma. He retired in 1913 and moved near Albion, Oklahoma, where the home he lived in still stood in 2010.

Only in 1892 did Kósyk pick up poetry and writing again. He also renewed his neglected contacts with Sorbian intellectuals. Bogumił Šwjela wanted to publish an anthology of Kósyk's poems, which appeared in 1893. Kosyk continued to have poems published in Lusatia until 1898.

After the deaths of Kósyk's only son, Juro, (at age 24 after a horse-riding accident) in 1915 and his wife Anna in 1929, Kósyk became increasingly isolated. He eventually married his housekeeper Wilma Filter in 1938. Wilma left Albion a year after Kósyk's death taking his papers with him; these have been deemed lost. During this last period, Kósyk maintained intensive contacts with the young Sorbian writer Mina Witkojc.

== Heritage ==
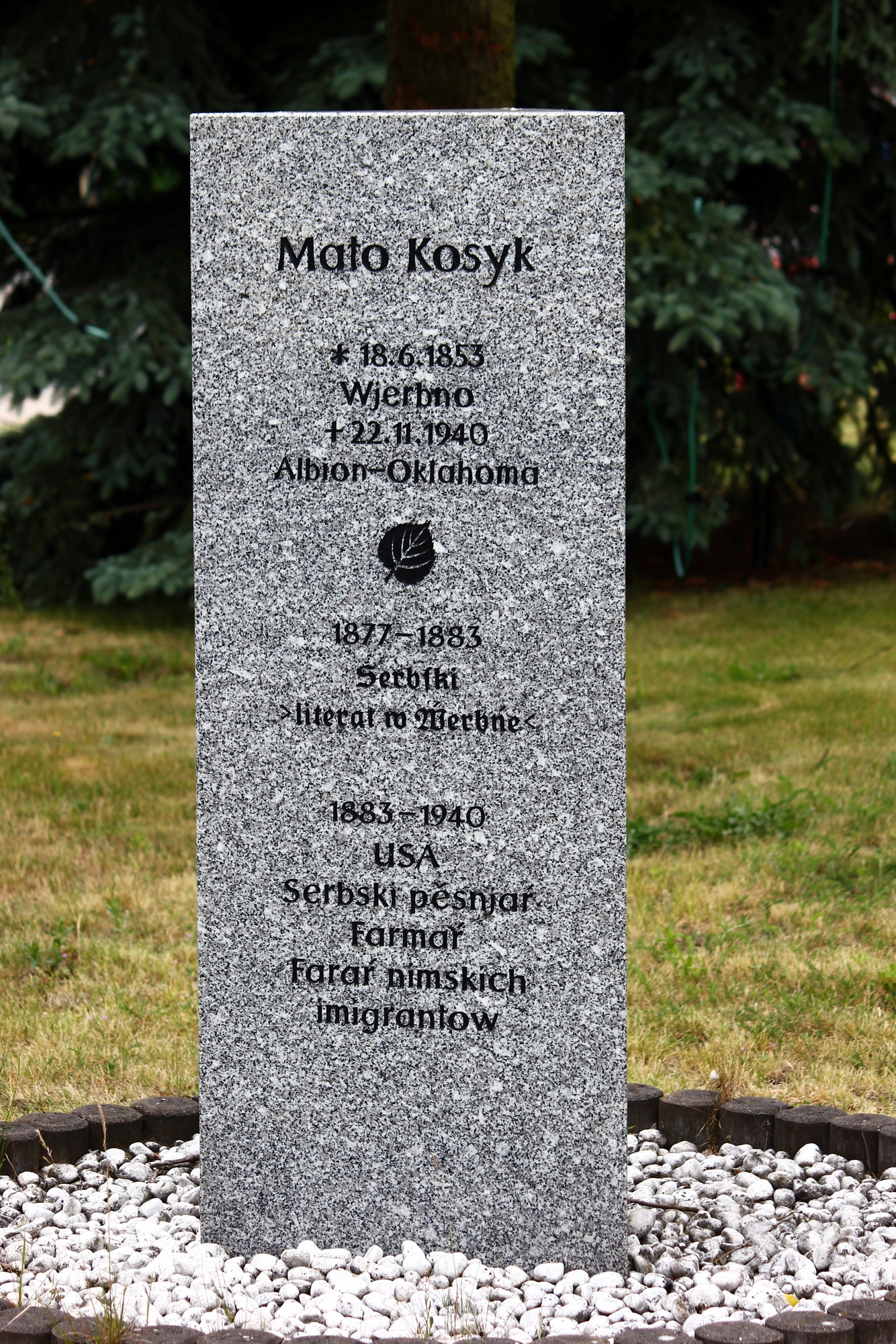
Memorial in Werben/Wjerbno

Mato Kósyk's work is predominantly lyrical, and includes very little prose. His poems are concentrated around the Christian faith, which Kósyk generally connected to nature in general and Lusatia in particular. The latter is the equivalent of the homeland, of the Heimat, and is contrasted with the foreign. Kósyk identifies this through the Sorbian language, which on the one hand combines beauty and vulnerability and on the other hand has to battle against imminent extinction.

Kósyk used both classical form as well as rhyming forms taken from folk culture for his poems. His preference was for the hexameter form. For example, his Serbska swajźba w Błotach (The Sorbian Wedding in the Spreewald) consists of nearly 2,000 hexameters. Hexameters are also used in Ten kśicowany (The Crucified) and Helestupjenje Jezusa Kristusa (The Descent of Jesus Christ to Hell).

The home were Kosyk lived from 1913 to 1940, situated near Albion, Oklahoma, Pushmataha County, called the Mato Kosyk House, has been added to the National Register of Historic Places. Its justification for inclusion is that it is the sole surviving structure associated with Kósyk. As in Kósyk's time, it features beautiful views of the Kiamichi Mountains.

The primary school in Briesen has been named after Kósyk.

=== Works ===
- Serbska swajźba w Błotach, 1880
- Pśerada markgroby Gera, 1881
- Branibora Pad, 1882
- Zběrka dolnoserbskich pěsnjow, 1893
- Zhromadźene spisy
- Pěsni, two parts, 1929–1930, published by Bogumił Šwela
