= Bogumił Šwjela =

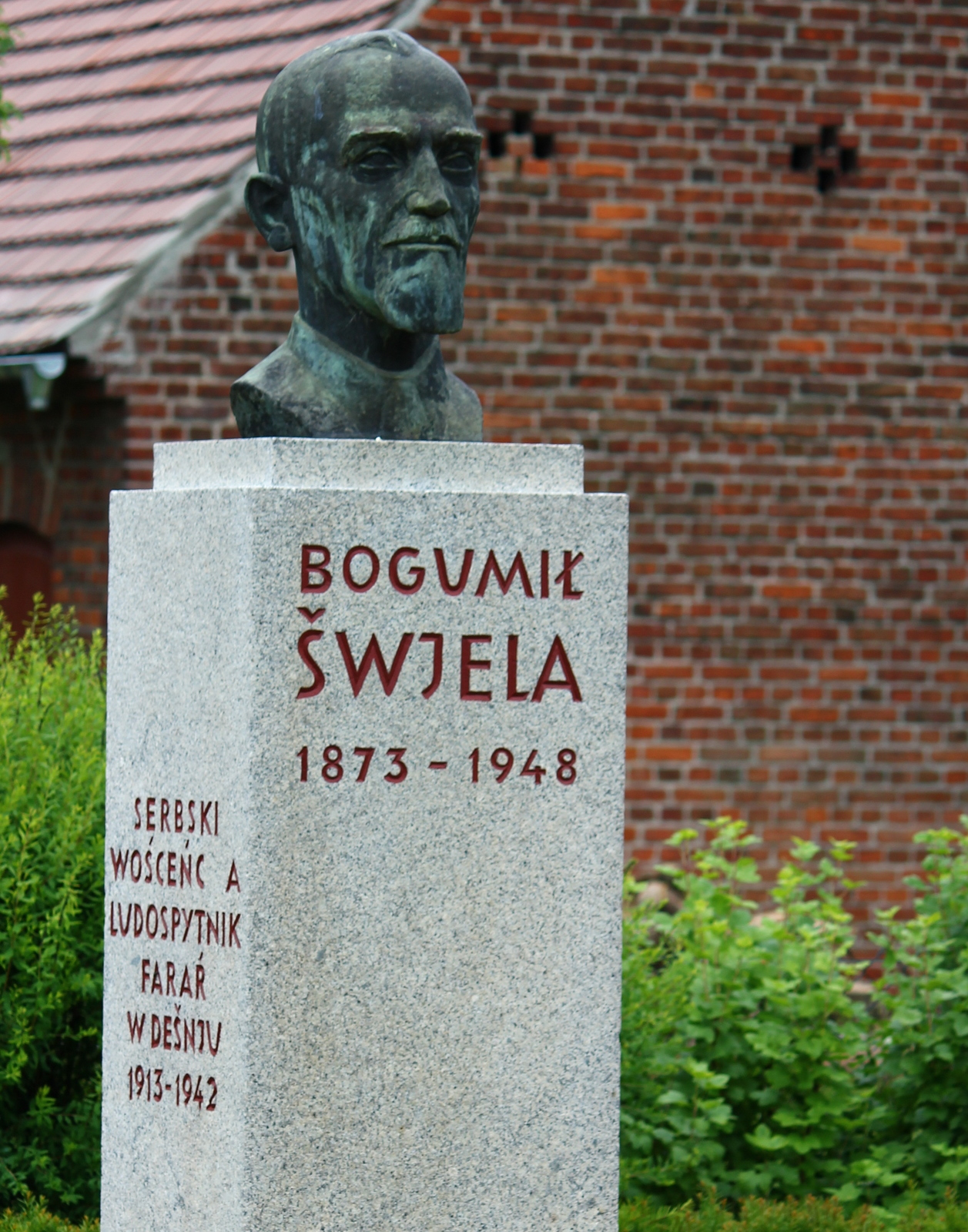
Bust in Dissen where Šwjela worked for 28 years as a pastor

Krystijan Bogumił Šwjela (also spelled "Schwela" and "Schwele") (5 September 1873 in Schorbus, Drebkau – 20 May 1948 in Naumburg) was a Wendish/Sorbian Protestant clergyman and ethnic activist in the Lower Lusatia region.

He also acted as a linguist and journalist, was chairman of the Maśica Serbska organization and co-founder of the Sorbian umbrella organization Domowina in 1912. Šwjela advocated the preservation of Sorbian language and culture in Lower Lusatia.

== Life ==
Šwjela was born to Kito Šwjela (1836–1922), an editor of the Lower Sorbian newspaper Bramborski Serbski casnik since 1864. Before attending Lower Sorbian Gymnasium Cottbus, Šwjela was schooled by his father. Šwjela in 1898 completed his studies in Lutheran theology and Slavistics in Leipzig, Halle, and Berlin in 1898. While studying, he became a member of Maśica Serbska. After graduation, he sought for a pastoral position in Lower Lusatia. Beginning in 1904, he was curate at the Wendish church in Cottbus, where he preached regularly in Lower Sorbian, rather than in German.

His ordination took place at a time when the oppression of Sorbian language and culture by the Prussian authorities peaked. Education in Sorbian at the Friedrich-Wilhelm-Gymnasium in Cottbus was stopped in 1888 and later religious instruction in the language was also stopped. The older Sorbian intellectuals were initially paralyzed. Šwjela, of the nationally conscious young Sorbian movement, was motivated strongly to work for the cultural interests of the Sorbs. Things came to a head in the Cottbus parish where he continued to minister in Sorbian. In 1908, Swjela had to leave the city because he had refused to hold sermons in German only. He was then several years as vicar in Nochten before he came to the Dissen parish in 1913.

Following in his father's journalistic footsteps, Šwjela wrote for the Lower Sorbian newspapers and magazines Pratyja, Bramborski Casnik, and Woßadnik, whose main author was also him. He founded the series Serbska knigłownja (Sorbian Library), in which he published mainly poetry but also literary, religious and popular scientific works by different authors. Šwjela published his textbooks for teaching the Lower Sorbian language in two parts, in 1906 and 1911.

Šwjela succeeded in motivating young Sorbs in his region to work on behalf of their traditional national cultural work. He strengthened them in their self-image by contacts in the Sorbian core areas of Upper Lusatia.

In 1912 Šwjela co-founded the Sorbian umbrella organization Domowina. He suggested the name for the association, and was also elected deputy chairman. In the interwar period Šwjela collected the Sorbian geographical name in the Cottbus area and worked on a Lower Sorbian dictionary. Neither work was allowed to be printed until after his death.

With the increased power of the National Socialists (Nazis) from 1933 onward, the pressure on the small Slavic minority in Germany increased. The imposition of prohibitions of Sorbian language and some cultural expression began in Domowina in 1937, initiating open persecution of Sorbian life. From that year onward, no publications in Sorbian were allowed to be published. While in most Protestant congregations, services were not held in Sorbian, Šwjela refused to be intimidated. During the Nazi era, he led in the renovation of the church in Dissen, where the Sorbian quotations were again painted on the balcony. He preached in Dissen and Sielow in Sorbian, even though this was forbidden. On April 7, 1941, the Gestapo informed the leading Wendish pastor that all the Wendish pastors' association had been dissolved and its assets seized. Hymn singing, teaching, and preaching was required to be in German, both officially and in private. Therefore, Šwjela was forced to retire and was banished from the Lower Sorbian area of Lusatia to Rudolstadt. In his exile, Šwjela remained committed to the Sorbian cause. Together with earlier companions, including the journalist Mina Witkojc and the painter Fritz Lattke, he developed an important foundation for the revival of the Lower Sorbian culture in the postwar period.

In 1946 he was involved in the re-establishment of the Lower Sorbian branch of Domowina and since 1947 he was editor of the Lower Sorbian newspaper Nowy Casnik. Before he found a new apartment in the Lower Sorbian region, Šwjela died in 1948 from a stroke on a railway journey from Rudolstadt to Cottbus. In Cottbus, a street was named in his honor.

== Sources ==
- Gerat Hančka: Šwjela, Bogumił. W: Jan Šołta, Pětr Kunze, Franc Šěn (wud.): Nowy biografiski słownik k stawiznam a kulturje Serbow. Ludowe nakładnistwo Domowina, Budyšin 1984, str. 556slsl.

== Works ==
- Lehrbuch der niederwendischen Sprache. Teil 1: Grammatik. Heidelberg 1906; Teil 2: Übungsbuch. Cottbus 1911.
- Kurzes Lehrbuch der Oberwendischen Sprache. Bautzen 1913.
- Evangelska wera mjes Sslowjanami. Bautzen 1915.
- Vergleichende Grammatik der ober- und niedersorbischen Sprache. Bautzen 1926.
- Das Wendentum in der Niederlausitz und im Spreewald. Bautzen 1929.
- Serbske praeposicyje. Pó hugronach z ludowych hust hobźěłane a zestajane. In: Časopis Maćicy Serbskeje. 1933/34.
- Deutsch-niedersorbisches Taschenwörterbuch. Domowina-Verlag, Bautzen 1953.
- Die Flurnamen des Kreises Cottbus. (= Deutsche Akademie der Wissenschaften zu Berlin. Veröffentlichungen des Instituts für Slawistik. Band 17). Akademie-Verlag, Berlin 1958.
