= Mina Witkojc =

Sorbian poet

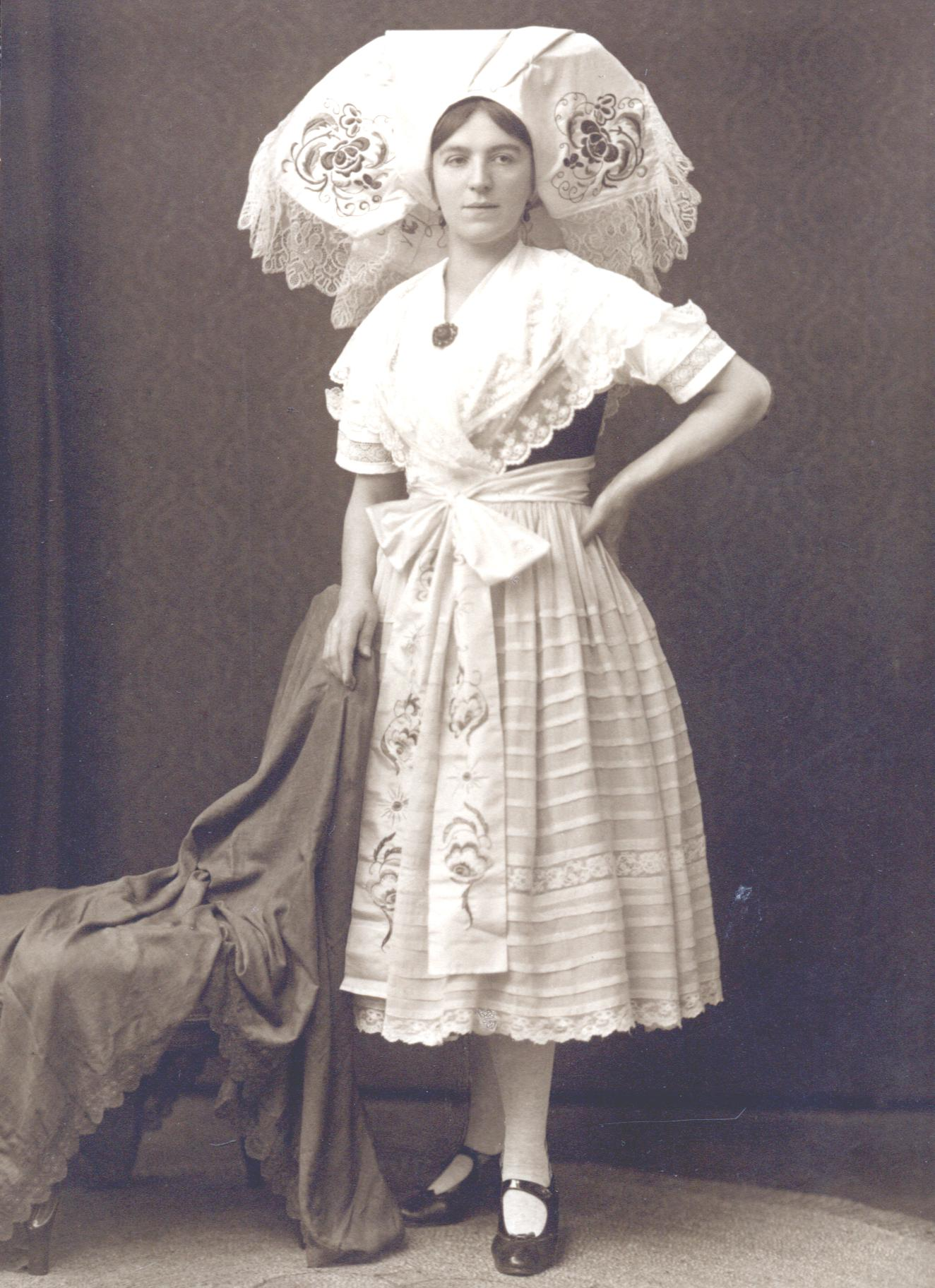
Mina Witkojc

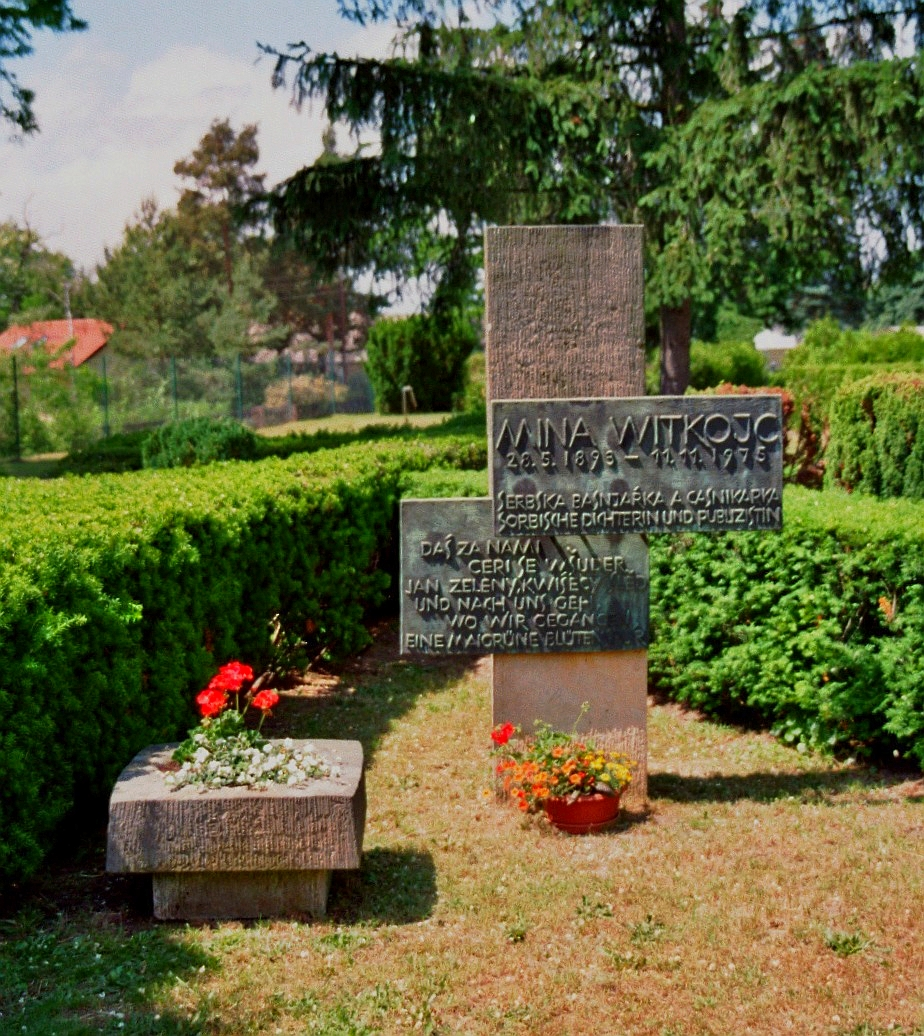
Grave of Mina Witkojc

Mina Witkojc (German: Wilhelmine Wittka; 28 May 1893, Burg (Spreewald) – 11 November 1975) was a Sorbian journalist, ethnic advocate, and poet. She wrote in and advocated for the Lower Sorbian language. Because of her support for democracy, she was persecuted by the Nazi regime and forced into exile. She returned to the town of Burg after the end of the Second World War to continue her cultural work.

== Life ==
=== Youth and Life in Berlin ===
Mina Witkojc was born in 1893 to Sorbian maid Marjana Witkojc (German: Marianne Wittka) and innkeeper Fritz Pohlenz, in Burg im Spreewald. The mother left Mina and her sister after 2 years, because their father had married another woman. She moved to Berlin to work as a 'Plätter'. Because of this, the two sisters grew up with their grandmother in their father's inn. She attended the public school in Burg.

In 1907 (age 13 or 14), Mina moved to Berlin and began working as a children's maid and a flower arranger to make ends meet. The same year, she wrote her first poems in German. In 1914 she started working in the armaments industry.

In 1917, Mina returned to Burg and worked as an agricultural day labourer.

=== Return to Sorbian culture ===
In August 1921, she happened to meet a group of Czech and Upper Sorbian intellectuals with Arnošt Muka who were traveling in the Spreewald. This encounter led to her becoming aware of her Wendish/Lower Sorbian origins again. Up until this point, she had mainly spoken and written in German.

She went to Bautzen, where she worked on the Lower Sorbian newspaper Serbski Casnik from 1923 onwards. During her time, its circulation rose from 200 to 1200 copies. During these years, she had many contacts with Upper Sorbian intellectuals, such as Arnošt Muka and Jan Cyž, from whom she received many suggestions. Mina Witkojc translated texts by authors of other Slavic languages into Lower Sorbian, such as the writers Božena Němcová and Petr Bezruč from Czech, Alexander Pushkin from Russian, and Handrij Zejler and Jakub Bart-Ćišinski from Upper Sorbian.

In 1926, Mina Witkojc took part in the International Congress of National Minorities in Geneva as a delegate. In 1930, she traveled to Yugoslavia for an all-Slav Sokol meeting.

In 1931, Mina Witkojc was pushed out of the management of the Serbski Casnik because of her democratic views, and in 1933 the new National Socialist government banned her from writing.

In 1936, she returned to her old home in Burg, where she again earned her living again as a day laborer in agriculture. In 1937, Sorbian publications were banned in Germany. Because she continued to express her self-confidence and fearlessness in her texts and poems and also maintained contacts with intellectuals of other Slavic nationalities, Mina Witkojc was first banned from the Dresden administrative district in 1941, and then from the Frankfurt/Oder administrative district in 1942. This forced her to leave Lausitz.

=== Exile ===
She initially moved to Erfurt, where she worked as an employee in a gardening business, among other things. During this time she maintained close contact with the Lower Sorbian priest Bogumił Šwjela, who had also been expelled from the Sorbian homeland, and the Sorbian painter Fryco Latk. In her extensive poem "Erfurtske spomnjeśa" ("Erfurt memories") she describes her experiences during this time.

In 1946 she returned to Bautzen, where she helped rebuild the Sorbian umbrella organization Domowina. In Niederlausitz all Sorbian activities were still suppressed by the SED district leadership in Cottbus at this time. For example, Witkojc was briefly arrested for alleged pro-Czechoslovak agitation while putting up Sorbian-language posters for the local elections.

In 1947 she went into the Wendish diaspora in the area around Varnsdorf, then later to Prague.

=== Last years in Burg ===
In 1954, Mina Witkojc returned from Prague and settled back into her hometown of Burg. She gained prominence as the co-author of an anthology and through publication of individual poems and articles in the Lower Sorbian newspaper Nowy Casnik. In 1955, a volume of poems entitled "K swětłu a słyńcu" ("To the light, to the sun") was published, which partly consists of reworked poems from the 1920s and 1930s in which she renounces the idea of Slavic unity. For example, the title of her first poem from 1921 was "Memories of the first meeting with Czech and Upper Sorbian brothers", but the 1955 version only mentions "Upper Sorbian brothers".

She spent her last months in a nursing home in Papitz, where she died in 1975.

== Honors ==
- 1964 she was awarded the Ćišinski Award.
- Since 2016, the public school and the public library in Burg bear her name.
- There is a Mina-Witkojc-Straße ('Mina Witkojc Street') in Cottbus
- Since 2018, the state of Brandenburg honors people for Sorbian language activism with a Mina Witkojc Award
- Google Doodles featured her on 28 May 2024. The date was chosen to honor her date of birth in 1893.

== Works ==
- Dolnoserbske basni, Budyšin 1925
- Wĕnašk błośańskich kwĕtkow, Budyšin 1934
- K swĕtłu a słyńcu, Berlin 1955
- Prĕdne kłoski, Berlin 1958
- Po drogach casnikarki, Budyšin 1987

=== Film ===
- 1984: Und auf steht die Wahrheit (DEFA documentary directed by Toni Bruk)
