= Korla Awgust Kocor =

Sorbian composer and conductor

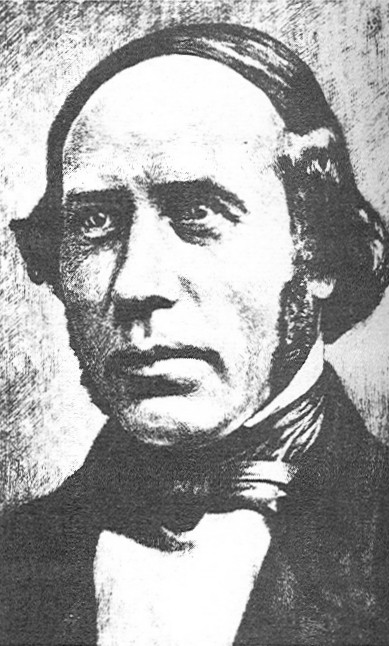
Korla Awgust Kocor

Korla Awgust Kocor (3 December 1822 – 19 May 1904; German: Karl August Katzer) was a Sorbian composer and conductor.

Kocor was born in Berge/Zahor near Großpostwitz/Budestecy in Upper Lusatia. He was the composer of the music of the Lusatian national anthem Rjana Łužica. He has been called the "founding father of secular Sorbian music."
