= Jurij Koch =

German writer

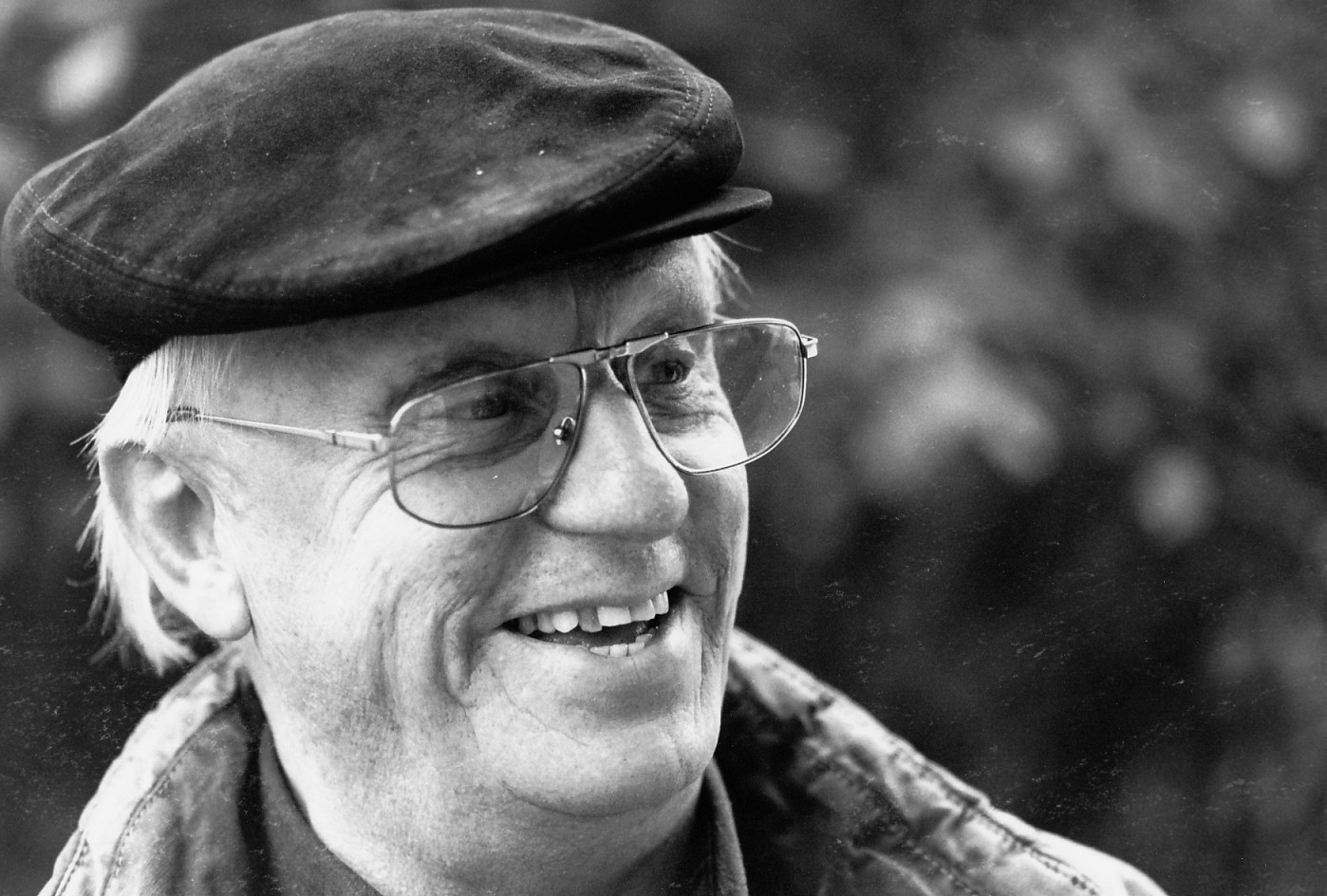
Jurij Koch (1995)

Jurij Koch (born 15 September 1936) is a German writer. He writes in both Sorbian languages as well as German.

Koch's father worked in the nearby quarry, his mother worked several jobs at different farms. Jurij Koch went to school in Crostwitz, northern Czechoslovakia, Bautzen and Cottbus, and studied at the University of Leipzig.

He has worked as an editor and reporter.

== Awards ==
- Ćišinski Award, 1976
- Carl Blechen Award, 1983
- Literature award "Umwelt" by the federal state of North Rhine-Westphalia, 1992
