= Kito Lorenc =

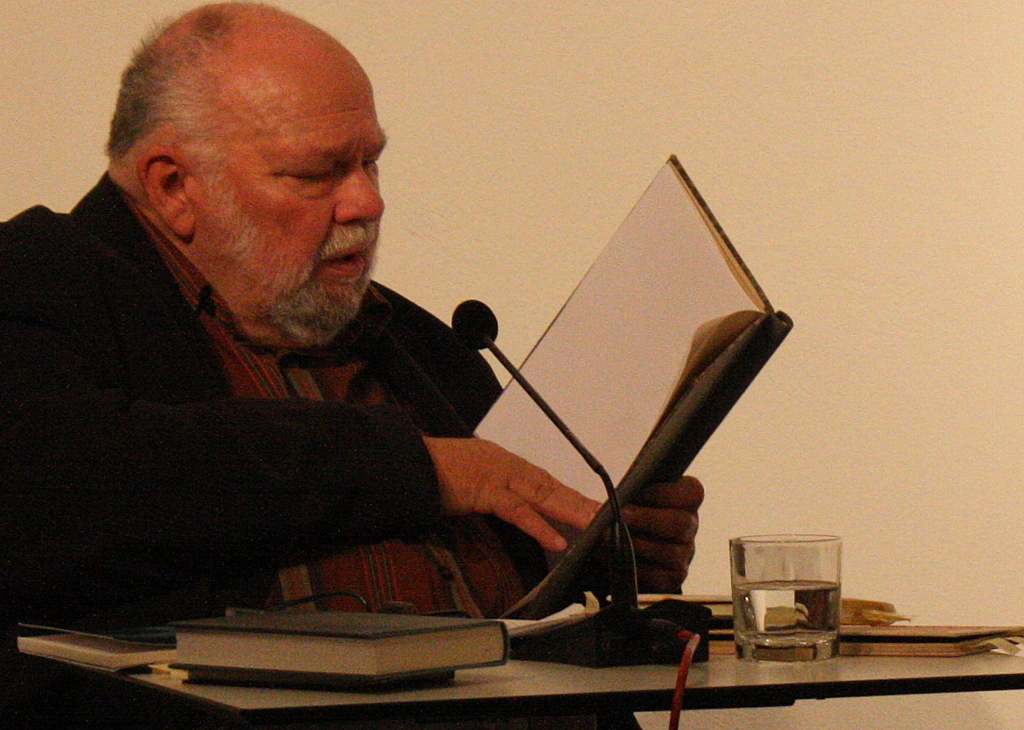
Kito Lorenc (2013)

Kito Lorenc (4 March 1938 – 24 September 2017) was a Sorbian writer, lyric poet and translator. He was a grandson of the writer and politician Jakub Lorenc-Zalěski.

Lorenc attended the Sorbian boarding high school in Cottbus from 1952 to 1956 and majored in Slavic studies in Leipzig from 1956 to 1961. He was an employee at the Institute for Sorbian People Research in Bautzen between 1961 and 1972.

From 1972 until 1979, he worked as a dramaturge at the State Ensemble for Sorbian People's Culture. Kito Lorenc was a member of the Sächsischen Akademie der Künste and lived as a freelance writer in Wuischke by Hochkirch.

== Works ==
- "Nowe časy - nowe kwasy" (New Times - New Weddings), Poems, VEB Verlag Domowina, 1962
- "Swĕtło, prawda, swobodnosć" (Light, Justice and Freedom), (Anthology of Sorbian Poets, Editor) VEB Verlag Domowina, 1963
- Mina Witkojc "Po pućach časnikarki", Translation in Upper Sorbian, VEB Verlag Domowina 1964
- Handrij Zejler "Serbske fabule", Translation, VEB Verlag Domowina 1966
- "Struga. Bilder einer Landschaft (Struga. Pictures of a Landscape)", Poetry, VEB Verlag Domowina, 1967
- "Der betresste Esel", Fabeln von Handrij Zejler, Translation, 1969, new at Domowina-Verlag 2004
- "Flurbereinigung", Poetry, Aufbau Verlag 1988
- "Gegen den grossen Popanz. (Against the Great Popanz)", Poetry 1990
- "Achtzehn Gedichte der Jahre 1990-2002 (18 Poets of the Years 1990-2002)" Selections from Manfred Peter Hein
- "An einem schönbemalten Sonntag : Gedichte zu Gedichten (A beautifully painted Sunday: Poetry to Poets)", Edition Thanhäuser
- Rudolf Hartmetz, Hans Mirtschin, Kito Lorenc "Terra budissinensis", Lusatia 1997
- Jurij Chĕžka "Die Erde aus dem Traum (The Earth from the Dream)", Domowina-Verlag 2002
- "Die Unerheblichkeit Berlins (Berlin's Unconsiderablity)", Buch&Media 2002
- "Die wendische Schiffahrt (The Wendish Voyage)", Domowina-Verlag 2004

== Awards ==
- Literature Prize of Domowina
- Heinrich Heine prize of the Ministry for culture of the GDR 1974
- Ćišinski Prize
- Heinrich Mann Prize 1991
- Förderpreis Literatur zum Kunstpreis Berlin
- Lessing Prize of the Free State of Saxony 2009
- Petrarca-Preis 2012
