= Räckelwitz =

Räckelwitz Worklecy
- Municipality
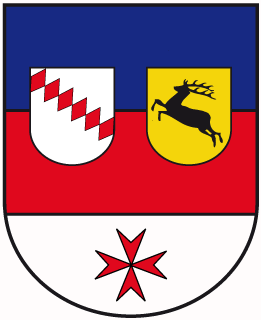
- Coat of arms

- Location of Räckelwitz; Worklecy within Bautzen district
- Interactive map of Räckelwitz; Worklecy
- Location within Germany Location within Saxony
- Coordinates: 51°15′N 14°14′E
- Country: Germany
- State: Saxony
- District: Bautzen
- Municipal assoc.: Am Klosterwasser
- Subdivisions: 6

Government
  - Mayor (2022–29): Clemens Poldrack

Area
  - Total: 11.51 km^{2} (4.44 sq mi)
- Elevation: 164 m (538 ft)

Population (2025-12-31)
  - Total: 1,126
  - Density: 97.83/km^{2} (253.4/sq mi)
- Time zone: UTC+01:00 (CET)
  - Summer (DST): UTC+02:00 (CEST)
- Postal codes: 01920
- Dialling codes: 035796
- Vehicle registration: BZ, BIW, HY, KM
- Website: www.raeckelwitz.de

Räckelwitz (German) or Worklecy (Sorbian, pronounced [ˈwɔʁklɛtsɨ]) is a municipality in Bautzen district, in the state of Saxony, Germany. The municipality of Räckelwitz has a population of 1,111 (2020) and is a member of the municipal association "Am Klosterwasser" (Zarjadniski zwjazk „Při Klóšterskej wodźe“).

The municipality is in Upper Lusatia, and is part of the central area of Sorbian settlement. In 2001, 61.9% of people living in the municipality could speak Upper Sorbian.

Räckelwitz is also the name of the largest village in the municipality. The village has a population of 506. Räckelwitz is the birthplace of the well-known Sorbian author Jurij Brězan. The former prime minister of Saxony Stanislaw Tillich was born in Neudörfel/Nowa Wjeska.

== History ==
Räckelwitz is first mentioned in a document from 1280 which calls it Rokolewicz. From 1304 there was a manor house in the village. The house's last owner, Countess Monika zu Stolberg, bequeathed it the Sovereign Military Order of Malta, and from 1903 to 2000, the former manor was a Roman Catholic hospital run by that religious order.

== Location ==
The municipality is approx. 8 km east of the town of Kamenz and 15 km north-west of Bautzen, the capital of the local district. South of Räckelwitz are the "highlands" (Horjany) and the municipalities of Panschwitz-Kuckau and Crostwitz.

Bundesautobahn 4 passes by Räckelwitz by about 6 km to the south. The municipality is located in the west of Upper Lusatia on the edge of the West Lusatian Hills, between the pond region (Teichlandschaft) to the north, and the Lusatian Highlands to the south. Flowing east of Räckelwitz is the Klosterwasser, a tributary of the Black Elster river.

== Population by village ==
The municipality consists of the following villages (names given in both languages, German/Sorbian), with population figures for 2010:

- Dreihäuser/Horni Hajnk, 11 inh.
- Höflein/Wudwor, 136 inh.
- Neudörfel/Nowa Wjeska, 170 inh.
- Räckelwitz/Worklecy, 494 inh.
- Schmeckwitz/Smječkecy, 294 inh.
- Teichhäuser/Haty, 29 inh.

== Notable places ==
The Herrenhaus was built as a baroque manor house, a 9-axis building with one flight of stairs. Its chapel is notable as being in the style of the Beuron Art School. The Herrenhaus was turned into a hospital in the 20th century, with a total of 10,000 people born there. The 20th-century additions to the building were removed in 2009. A house in the garden is home to the Congregation of the Sisters of Divine Providence, who worked in the hospital until their retirement. The house itself contained a nursing department of the Sovereign Military Order of Malta, and is planning to become a home care and retirement home. The house contains several coats of arms and monogrammed stones of the House of Stolberg, its original owners.

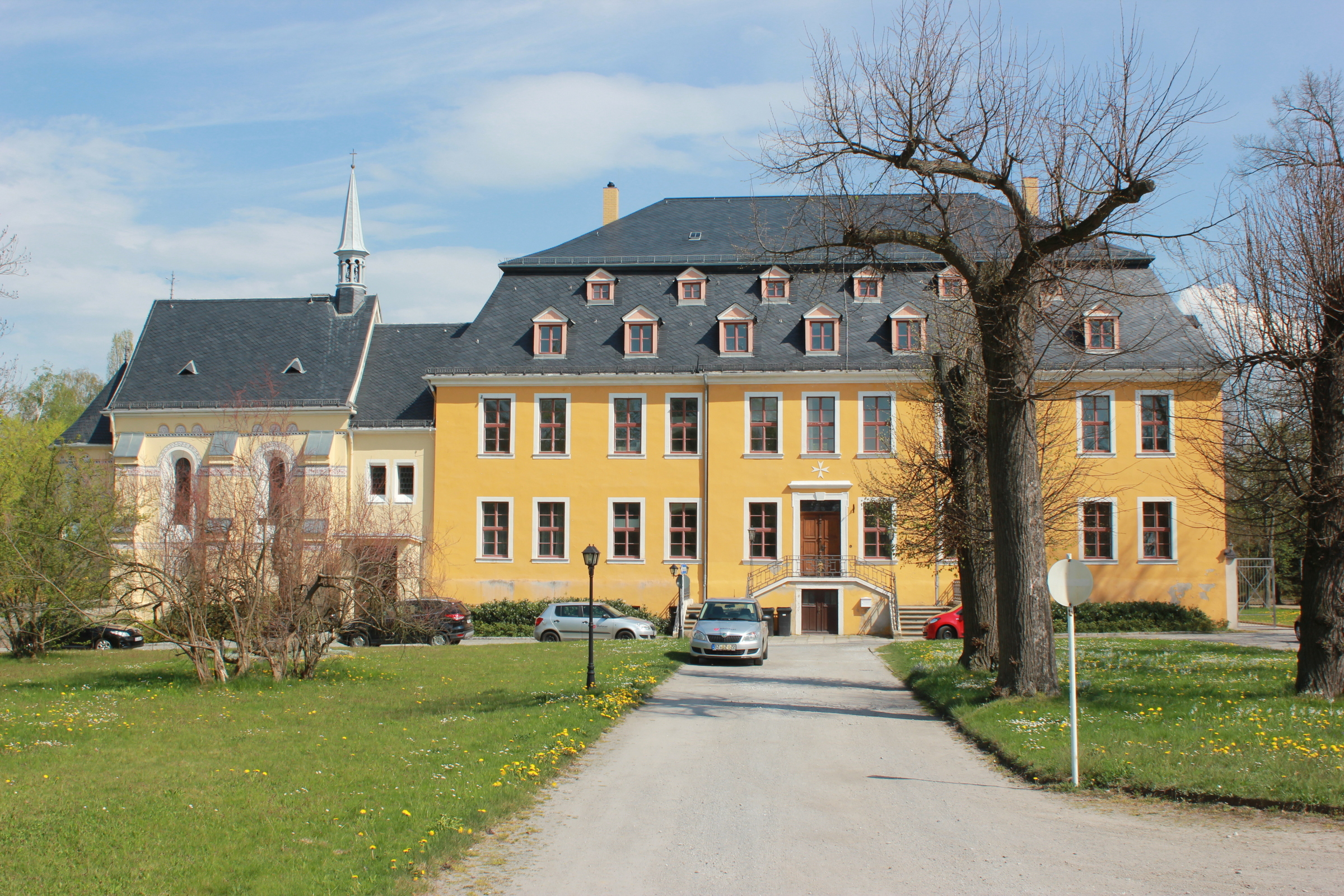
The Herrenhaus and chapel

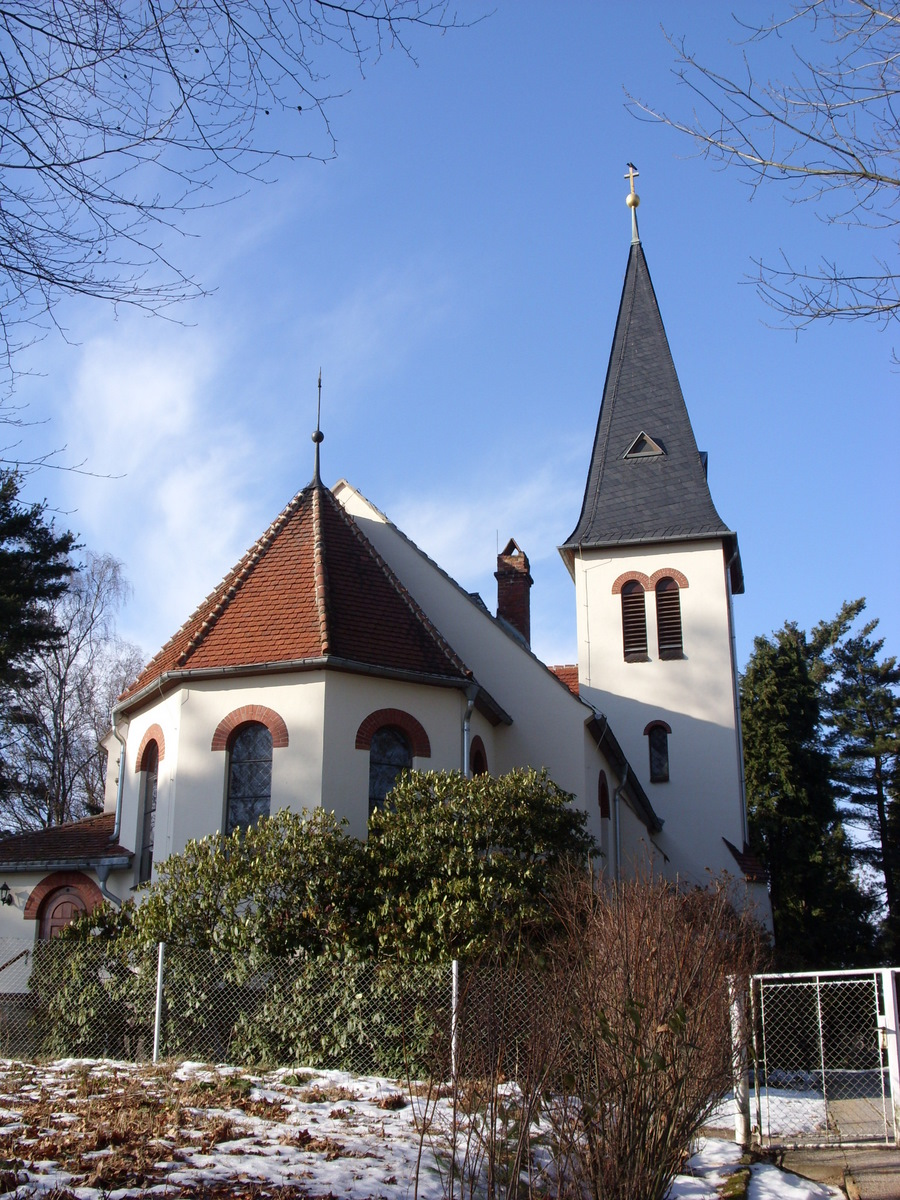
Evangelical church in Schmeckwitz/Smječkecy

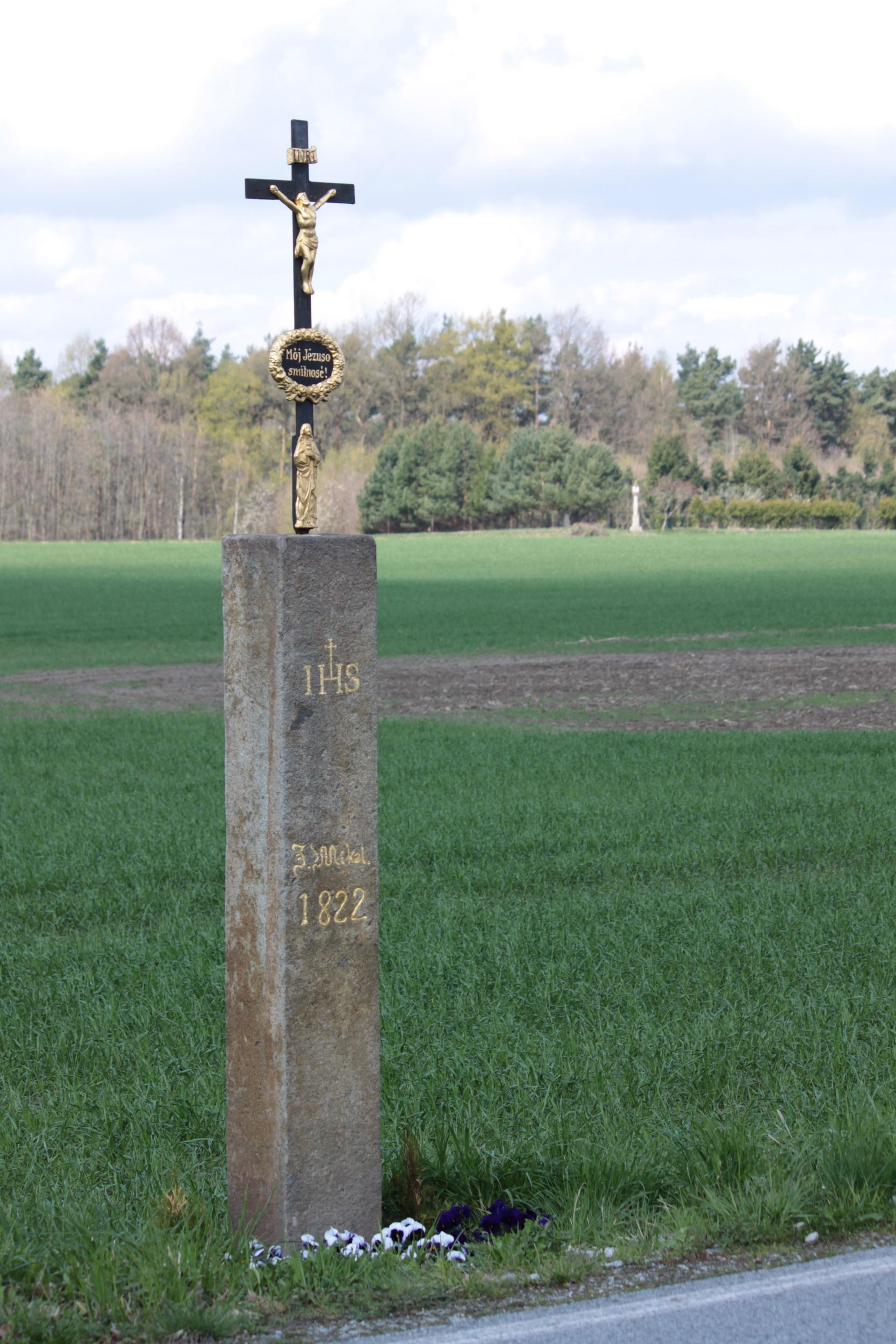
Wayside cross in Neudörfel/Nowa Wjeska

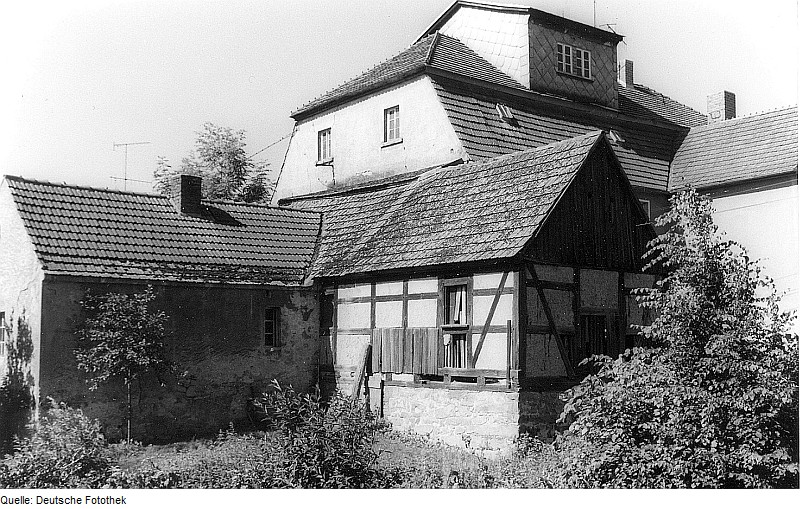
Former water mill in Neudörfel/Nowa Wjeska, 1987

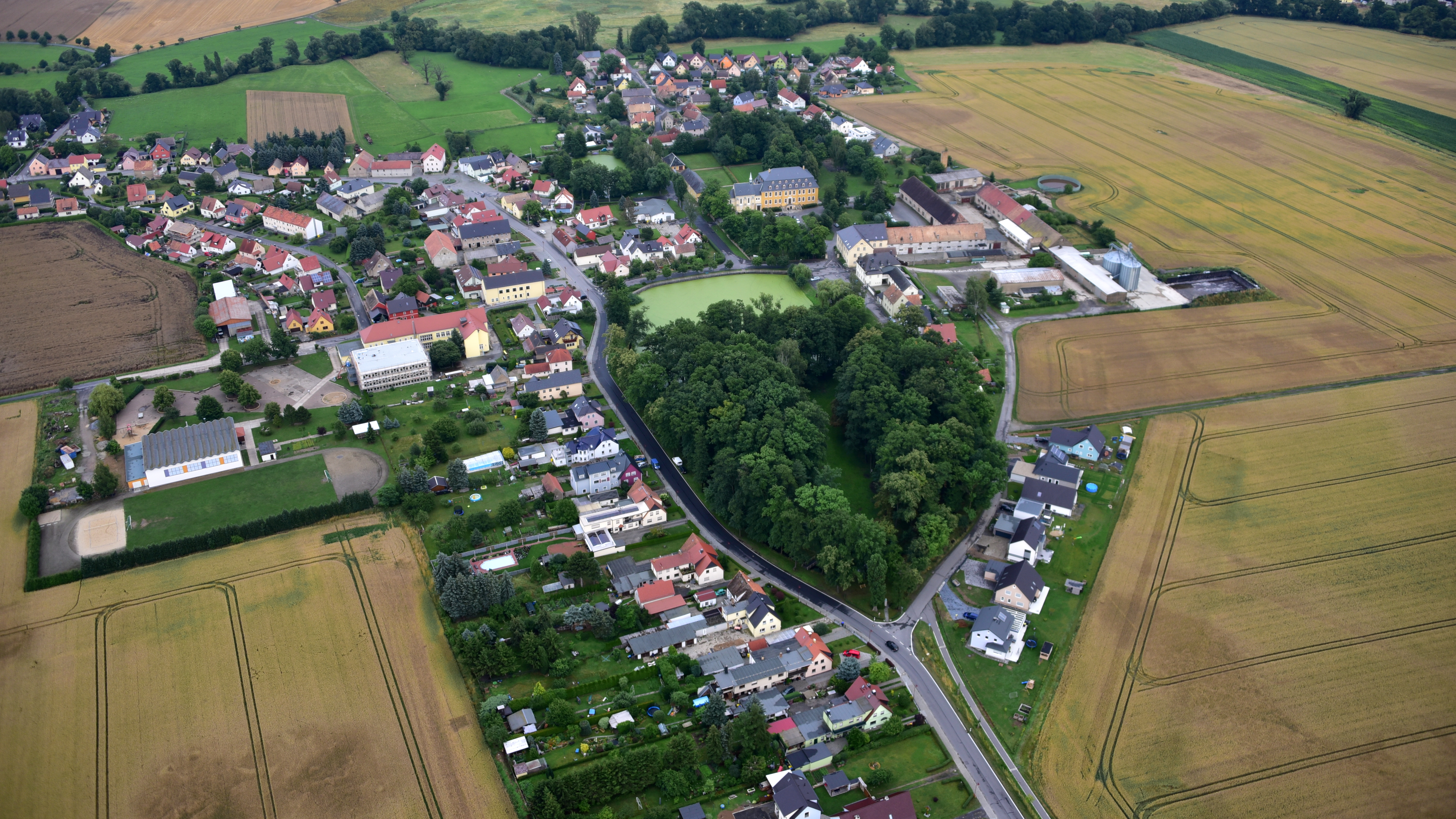
Aerial view of Räckelwitz/Worklecy village, 2017

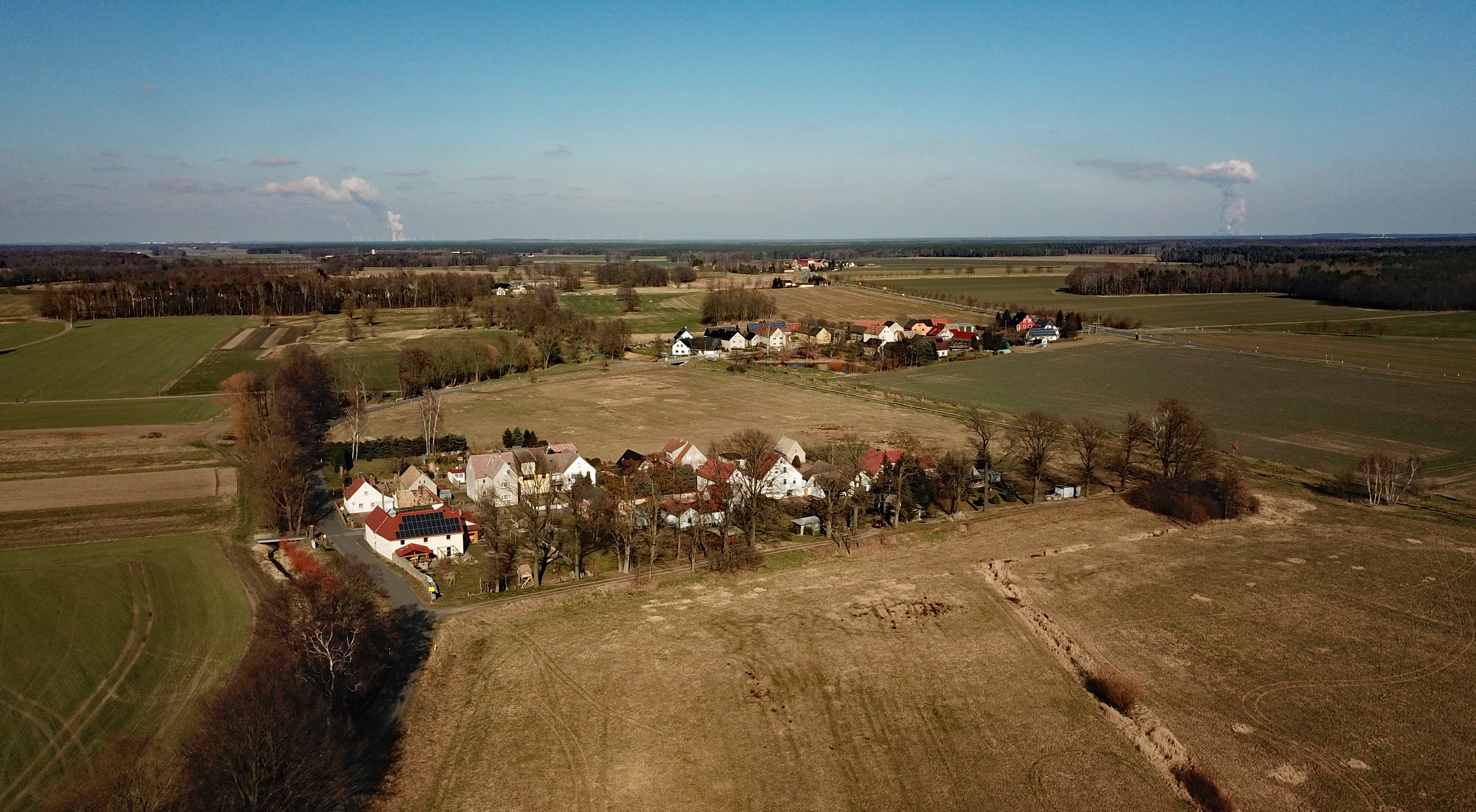
Aerial view of Teichhäuser/Haty

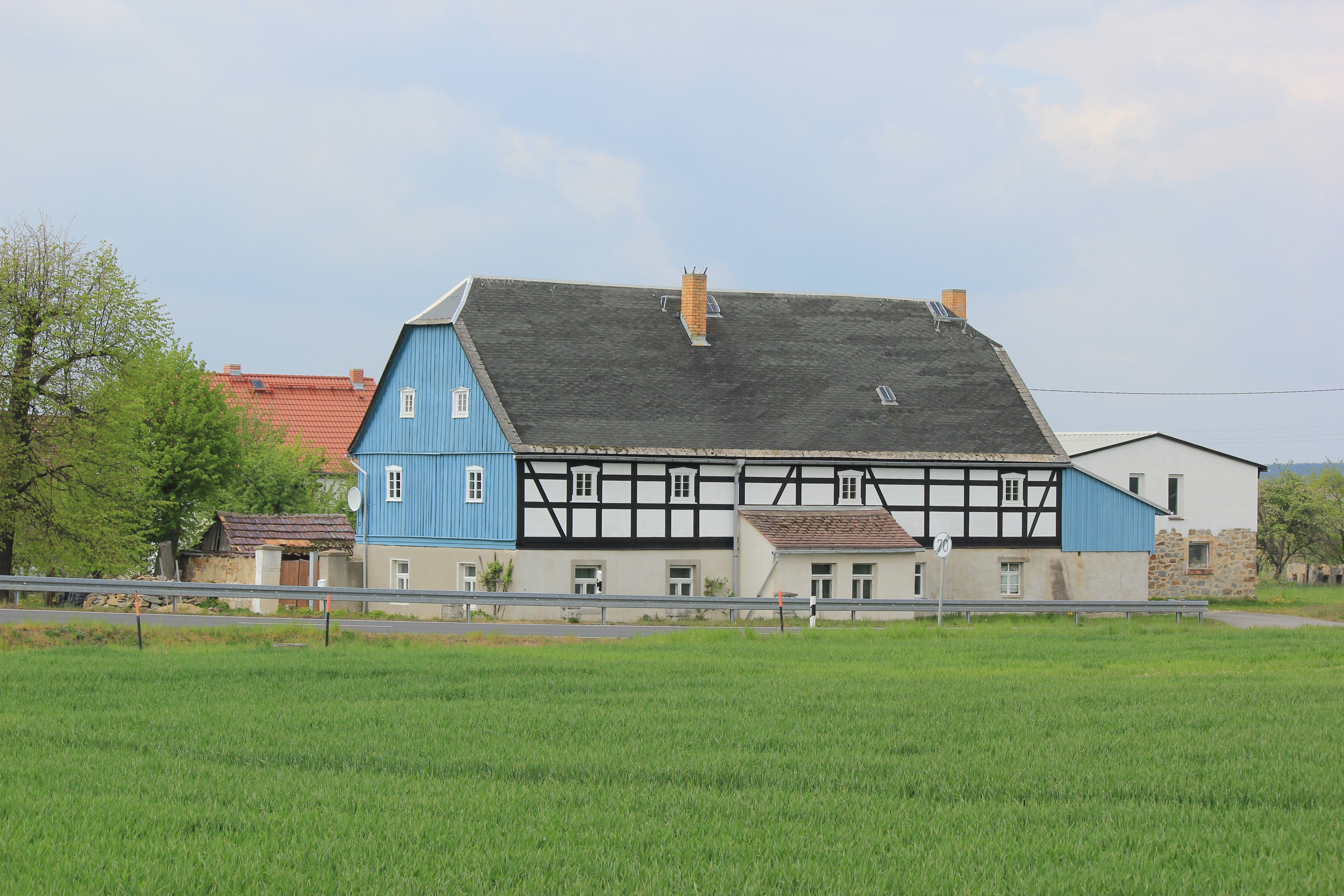
Lejpolt/Leopoldschenke guesthouse and cultural heritage monument

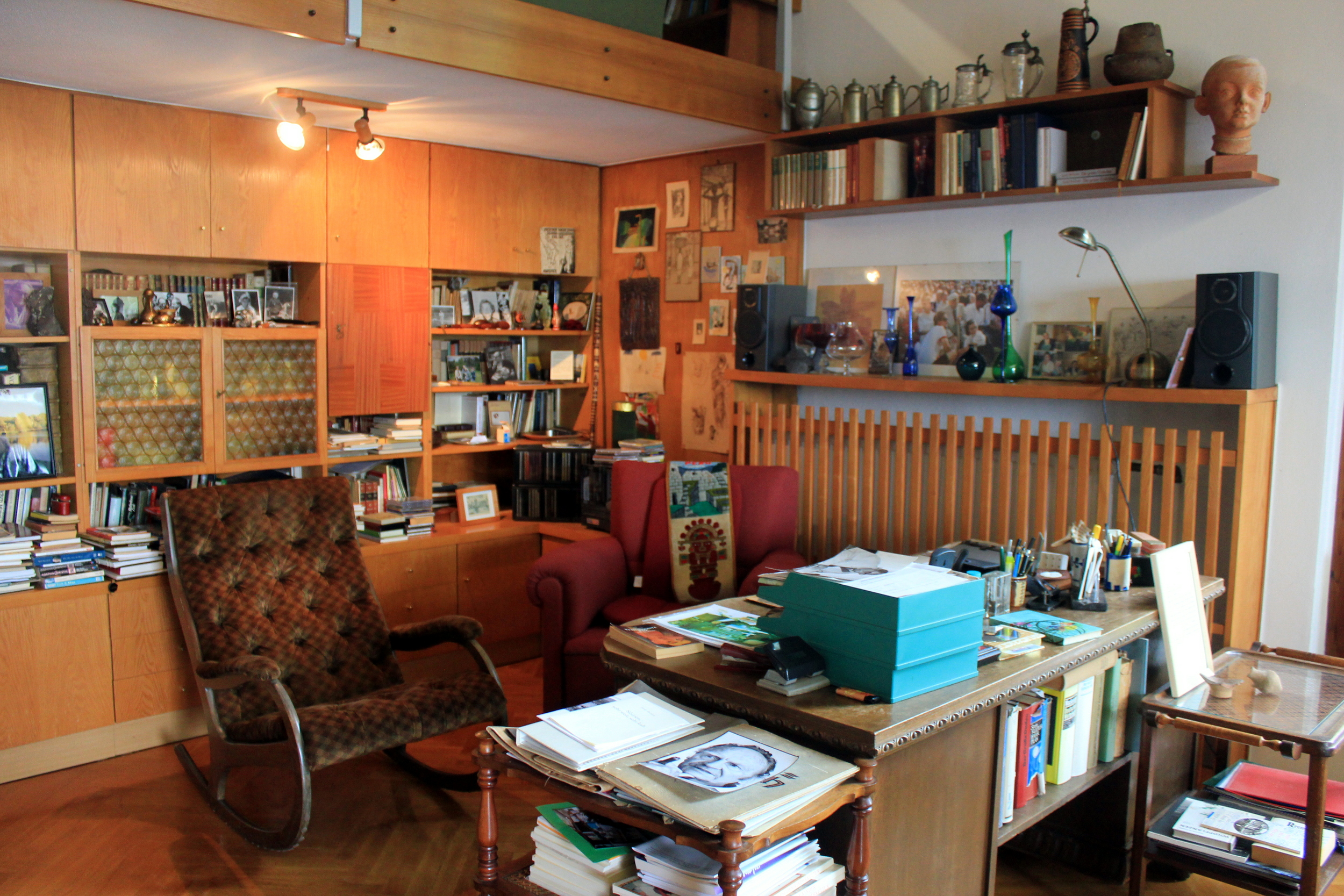
Study room of Jurij Brězan (1916–2006) in Horni Hajnk/Dreihäuser

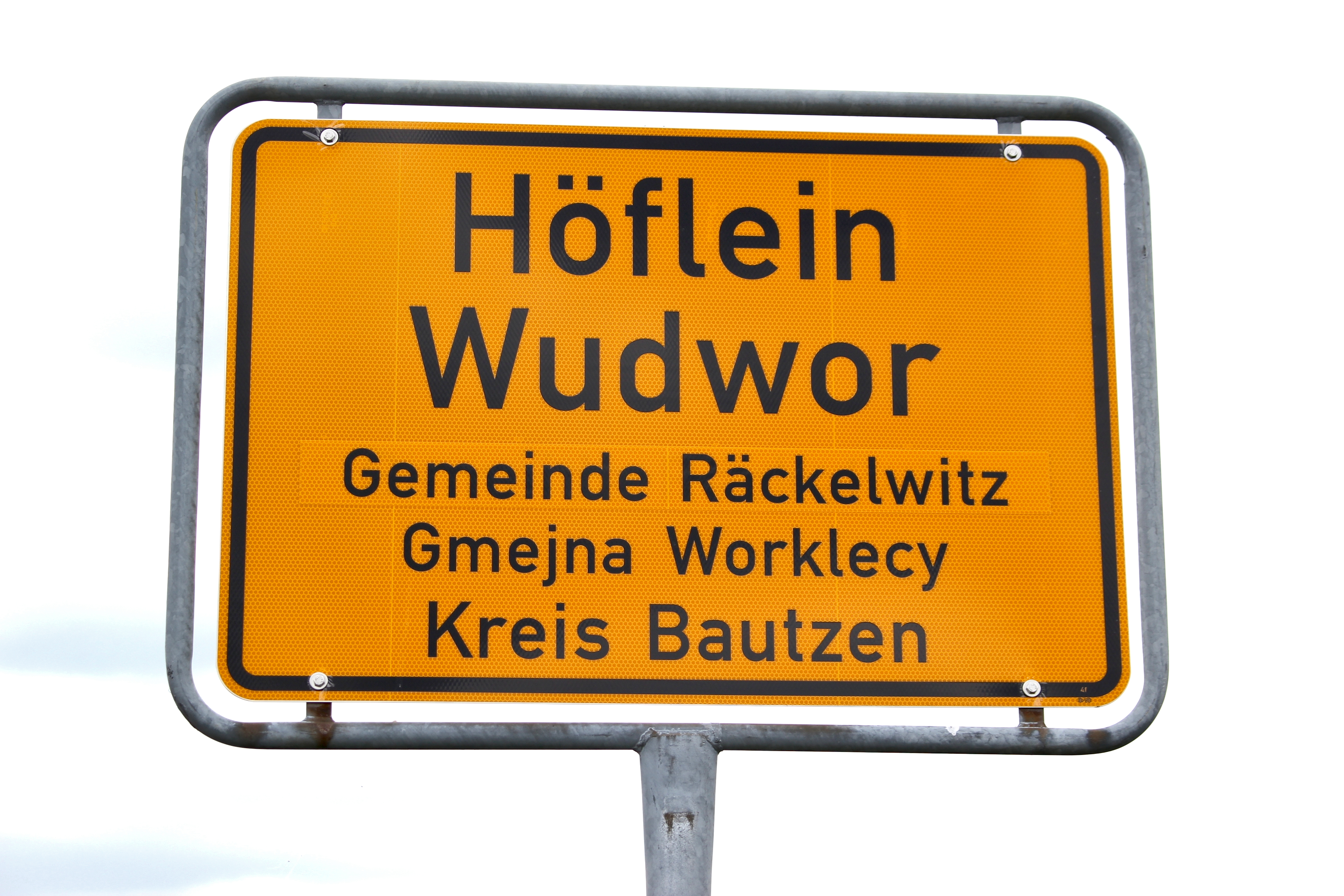
Bilingual road sign for Höflein/Wudwor

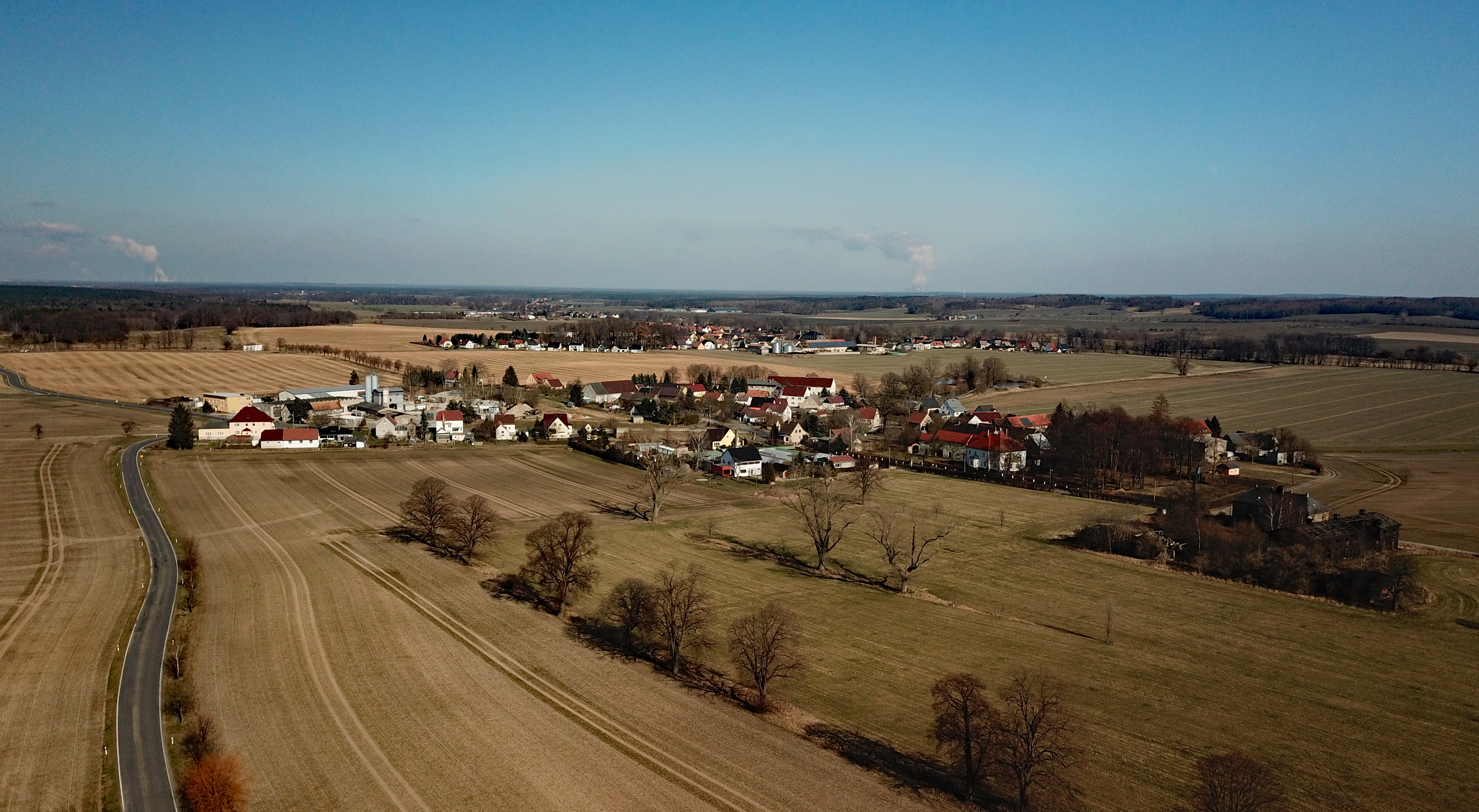
Aerial view of Höflein/Wudwor

== Education ==
Räckelwitz municipality has a primary school and Michał Hórnik Mittelschule, one of four remaining Sorbian Mittelschulen in Saxony.

== Notable people ==
The following famous people come from Räckelwitz municipality:

- Jurij Brězan (1916–2006), Sorbian author
- Stanislaw Tillich/Stanisław Tilich (b 1959), politician, prime minister of Saxony
- Jěwa-Marja Čornakec (b 1959), author and editor of the Sorbian cultural magazine Rozhlad
- Olaf Pollack (b 1973), professional cyclist
- Ronny Kockel (b 1975), goalkeeper for KFC Uerdingen 05
- Maximilian Krah (b 1977), lawyer and politician
- Tino Semmer (b 1985), footballer

== Local politics ==
The Local Council of Räckelwitz is currently composed of 12 members, with nine men and three women having been elected. The Saxon council elections 2009/2004 produced the following results:

Party or Association	2009		2004	
Party or Association	%	Seats	%	Seats
Christian Democrat Union of Germany (CDU)	70.6	9	75.3	9
Free Sorbian Voters' Association (FSWV)	25.4	3	24.7	3
Free Democratic Party (FDP)	4.0	0	-	0
Total	100.0	12	100.0	12
Electoral turnout	64.8%		60.5%	

The local council has 12 members (Election 2014)

- (CDU): 9 seats
- Free Sorbians Voters' Association (FSWV) (Freie Sorbische Wählervereinigung (FSW)): 3 seats

Poll: 62,2 %

Mayor: since 1974 Franz Brußk
