= Crostwitz =

Crostwitz/Chrósćicy
- Municipality
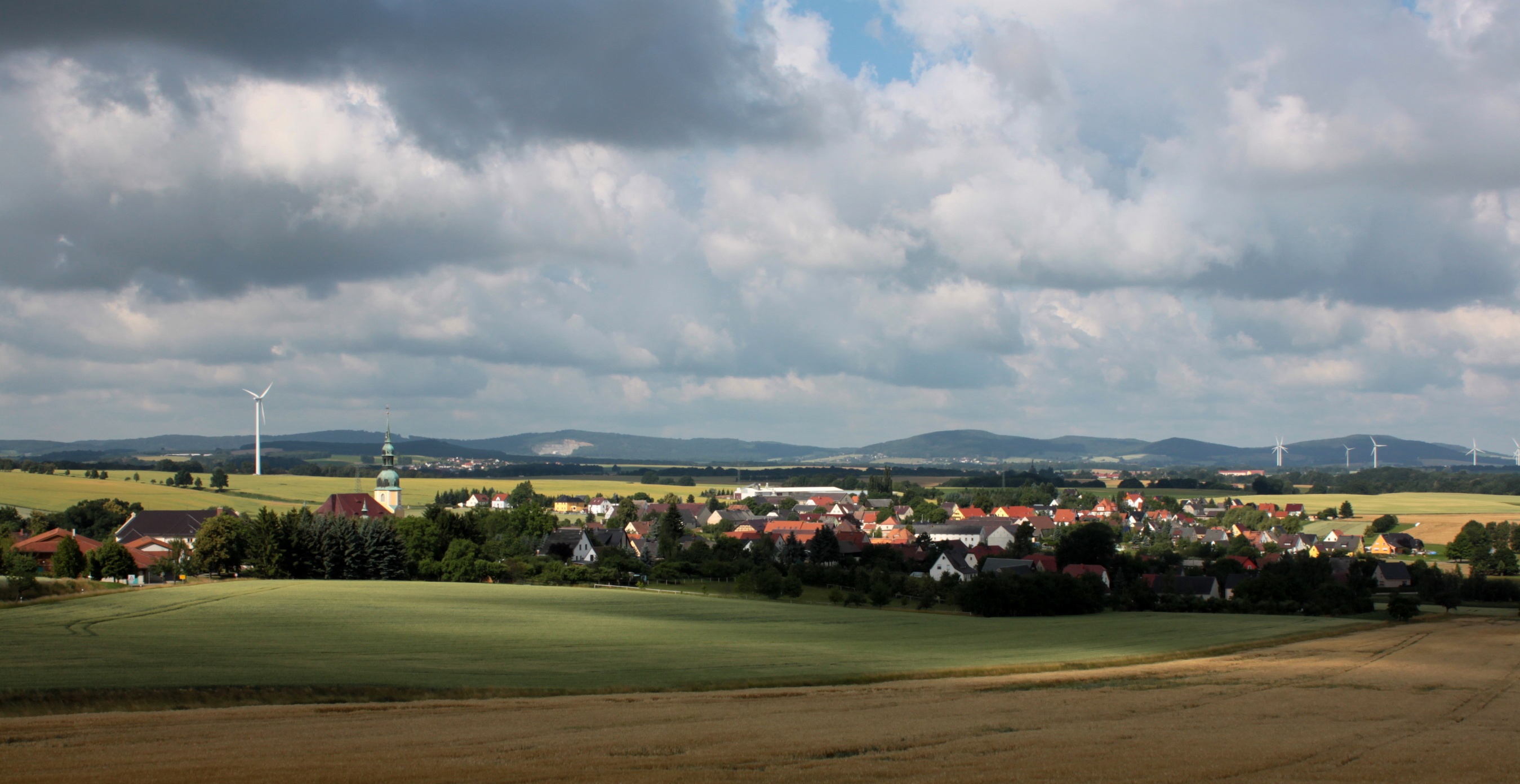
- Crostwitz seen from the west

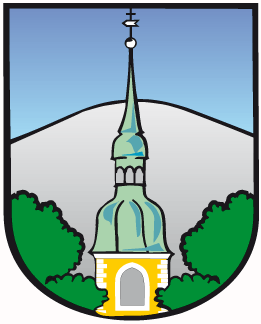
- Coat of arms

- Location of Crostwitz/Chrósćicy within Bautzen district
- Interactive map of Crostwitz/Chrósćicy
- Location within Germany Location within Saxony
- Coordinates: 51°14′N 14°14′E
- Country: Germany
- State: Saxony
- District: Bautzen
- Municipal assoc.: Am Klosterwasser
- Subdivisions: 6

Government
  - Mayor (2022–29): Marko Klimann (CDU)

Area
  - Total: 13.32 km^{2} (5.14 sq mi)
- Elevation: 170 m (560 ft)

Population (2025-12-31)
  - Total: 1,034
  - Density: 77.63/km^{2} (201.1/sq mi)
- Demonym(s): German: Crostwitzer; Upper Sorbian: Chróšćan (m.), Chróšćanka (f.)
- Time zone: UTC+01:00 (CET)
  - Summer (DST): UTC+02:00 (CEST)
- Postal codes: 01920
- Dialling codes: 035796
- Vehicle registration: BZ, BIW, HY, KM
- Website: www.crostwitz.de

Crostwitz or Chrósćicy (Upper Sorbian: [ˈkʁʊstʃitsɨ]) is a village and municipality in the center of the German district of Bautzen in Saxony. It is located in Upper Lusatia and is one of the centres of the Sorbian settlement area in Saxony.

The place name, like that of Crostau, is derived from the Old Slavic word chróst, meaning “brushwood,” “thicket,” or “shrubbery.” This is reflected in the Upper Sorbian word chrósćina, which means “undergrowth,” “bushes,” or “scrubland.”

== Geography ==
The village of Crostwitz is situated at between 160 up to 180 metres above sea level on both sides of Satkula brook, which flows into the Klosterwasser not far from the place. The eastern part of the settlement is dominated by the Church's hill, which is bordered by the brook in the south and the west. The larger part of Crostwitz stretches at the west side of Satkula, direction Panschwitz-Kuckau.

== History ==
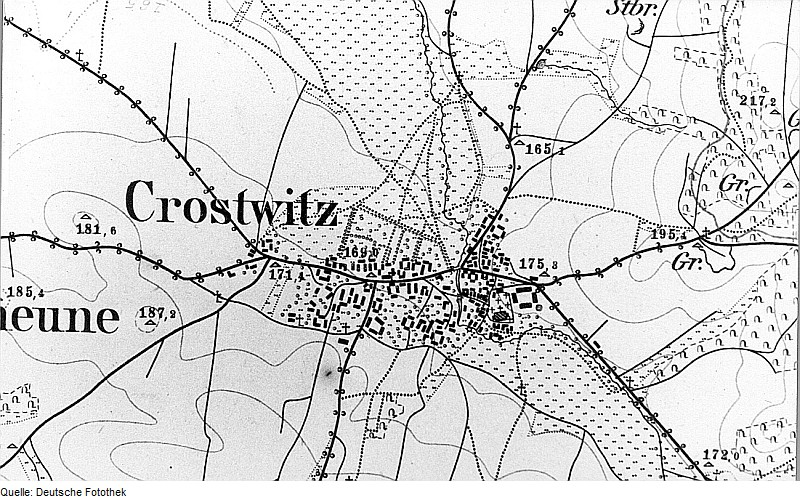
Crostwitz on a topographic map sheet, Section: Marienstern Monastery, 1884

Near the district of Kopschin are the remains of an old Slavic hillfort, known as the Kopschin Rampart (Kopschiner Schanze).

The village was first mentioned in written records in 1225 as the seat of the nobleman Henricus de Crostiz. From the 13th century onward, the parish church of Crostwitz held great importance for the region between Panschwitz, Storcha, and Rosenthal. Most other churches in the area were built only later.

Plans for the Saxon Northeastern Railway (Sachsen Nordostbahn) envisioned a route from Bautzen through Crostwitz toward Kamenz. However, with the outbreak of the First World War and, not least, due to strong local opposition, construction was halted and never resumed.

During the Nazi census of 1939, a total of 595 people throughout Lusatia declared themselves to be of “Wendish nationality” (Sorbian ethnicity), even though this was explicitly discouraged because the Sorbs were officially portrayed as a “German tribe.” Of these so-called “confessing Wends” (Bekenntniswenden), whose declarations posed a political problem for the regime, 364 came from Crostwitz alone. Prior to the census, the parish priest Jan Wjenka had urged people to identify themselves as Sorbs regardless of the state's nationality policy.

In April 1945, when the Second World War had already ended elsewhere, heavy fighting took place in the region between Army Group South, several SS units, the Second Polish Army, and the Red Army. A memorial created by Johannes Peschel and erected in 1980 on Fulkec Hill (Fulkec hora) commemorates the many victims.

On 10 May 1945, only five days after the end of the final military operations, the Domowina, the umbrella organization of Sorbian associations, was re-established in Crostwitz.

The neighboring village of Caseritz was incorporated into Crostwitz in 1957, followed by Horka and Nucknitz in 1974.

In 2001, two wind turbines with a rated capacity of 850 kW each were erected.

== Population ==
Crostwitz lies in the southeastern part of the Sorbian core settlement area and is one of its cultural centers. In 2001, 85.4% of the municipality’s inhabitants spoke Upper Sorbian. The majority of the population is also of the Catholic faith.

For his statistics on the Sorbian population in Upper Lusatia, Arnošt Muka recorded 538 inhabitants in the village during the 1880s, of whom 523 were Sorbs (97%) and 15 were Germans. Ernst Tschernik found in 1956 that only 73.9% of the population of the municipality of Crostwitz was Sorbian-speaking, mainly due to the influx of displaced persons from the former eastern territories.

According to the 2011 census, out of 1,058 inhabitants, 984 were Roman Catholic (93%), 15 Protestant (1.4%), and 59 belonged to another religion or to none (5.6%). In 2022, the share of the Catholic population was 90.0%, 2.3% were Protestant, and 8.0% belonged to another faith or to none. This makes Crostwitz the municipality in Saxony with the highest proportion of Catholics.

The main village itself has just under 600 inhabitants.

== Culture and sights ==
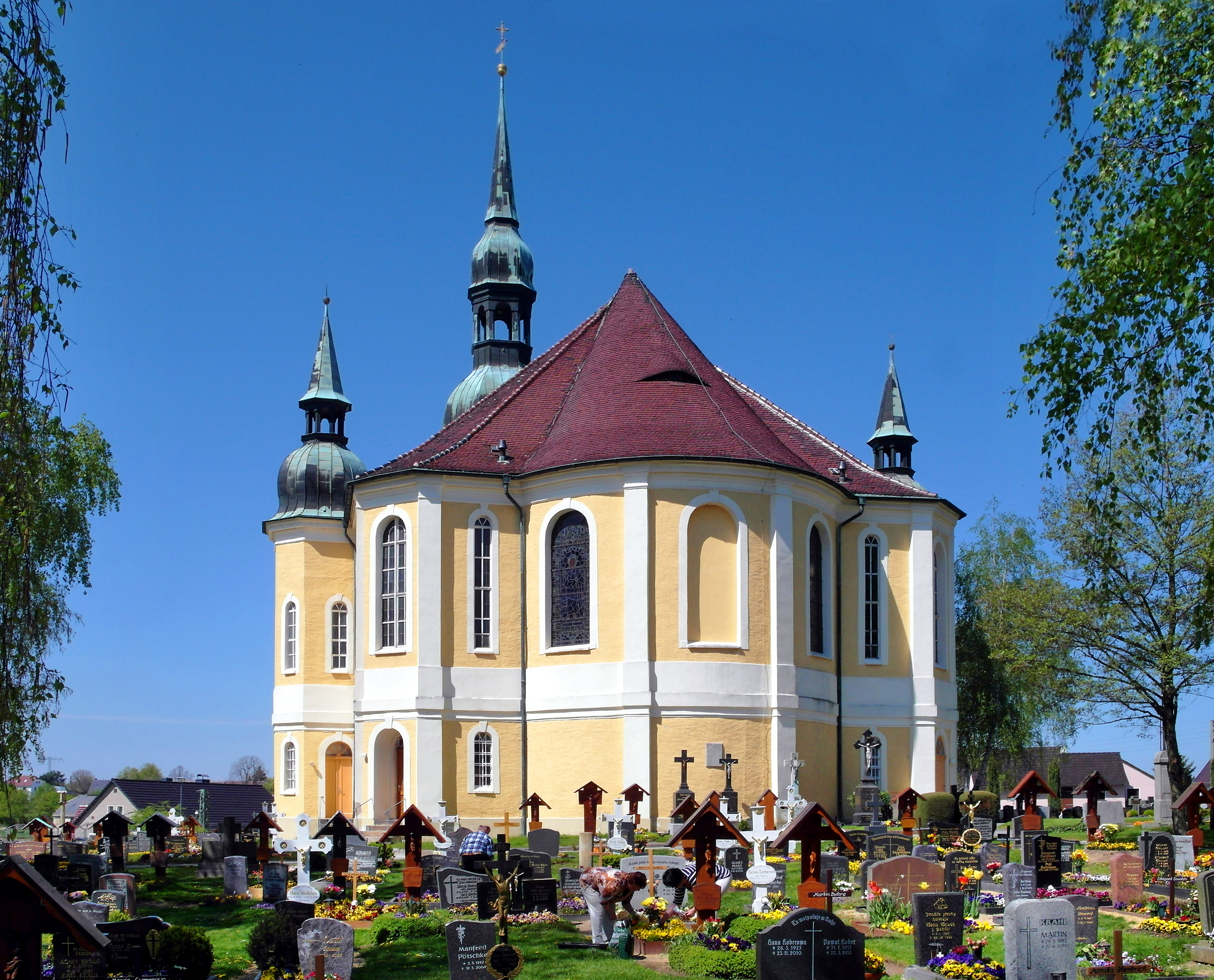
Catholic Church of St. Simon and Jude

Crosses, prayer columns, and Sorbian inscriptions (on street signs, shops, schools, etc.) along the roads testify that Crostwitz is one of the centers of the living Sorbian language and culture, strongly shaped by Catholic traditions.

In the district of Nucknitz, the Sorbian rock music festival Nukstock takes place every summer. Crostwitz itself hosts the International Folklore Festival Łužica/Lausitz every two years.

Crostwitz lies on the cycling route Auf den Spuren des Krabat (“In the Footsteps of Krabat.”)

The only Stolperstein (stumbling stone memorial) in Crostwitz is located in the district of Horka. It was designed in the Sorbian language and commemorates Annemarie Kreidl, who grew up there with Sorbian Catholic adoptive parents and was known as Annemarie Schierz (Hana Šěrcec). Because her biological parents were Jewish, she was arrested in 1942 and was probably murdered by the Nazi regime the following year.

=== Church ===
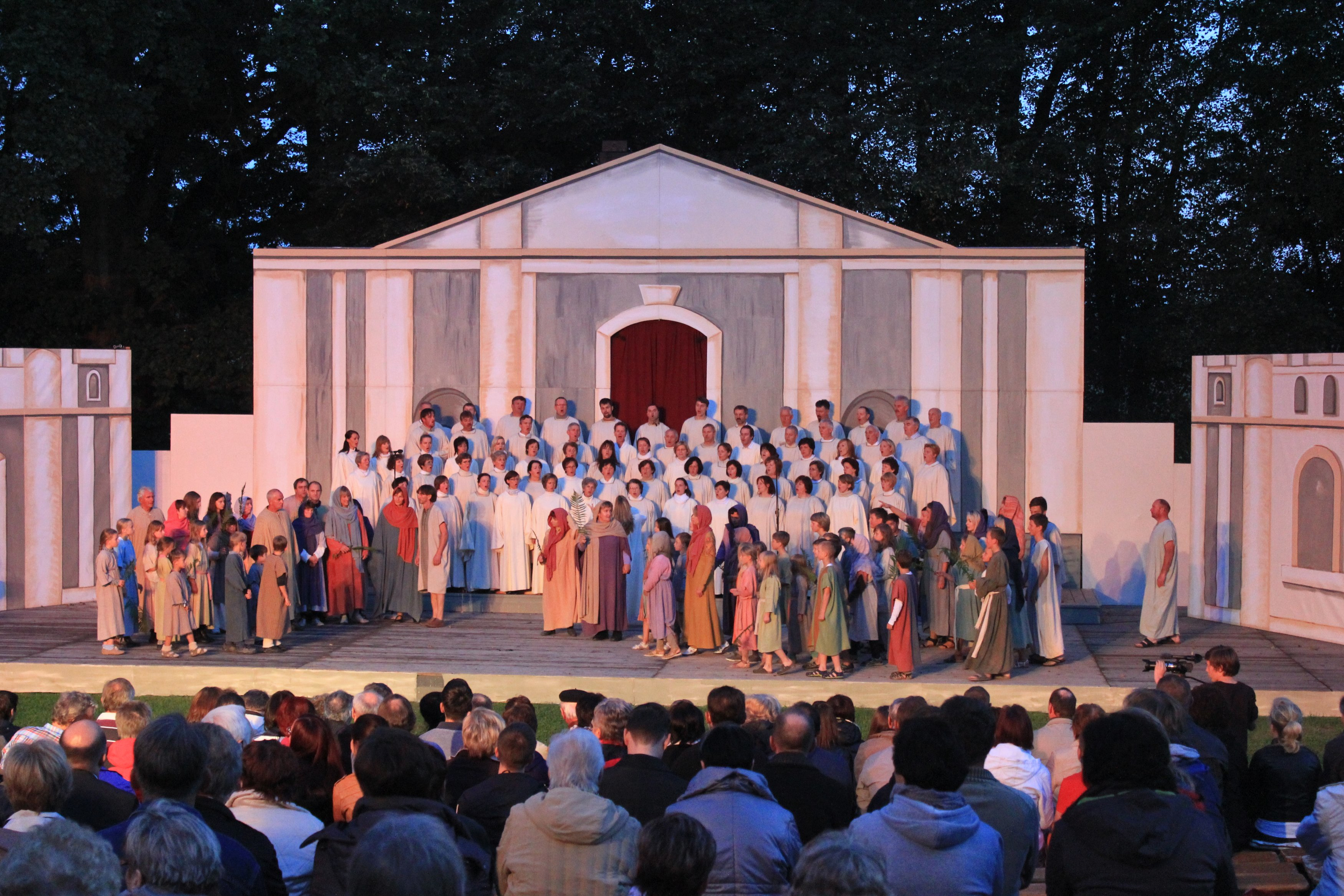
2015 Crostwitz Passion Play

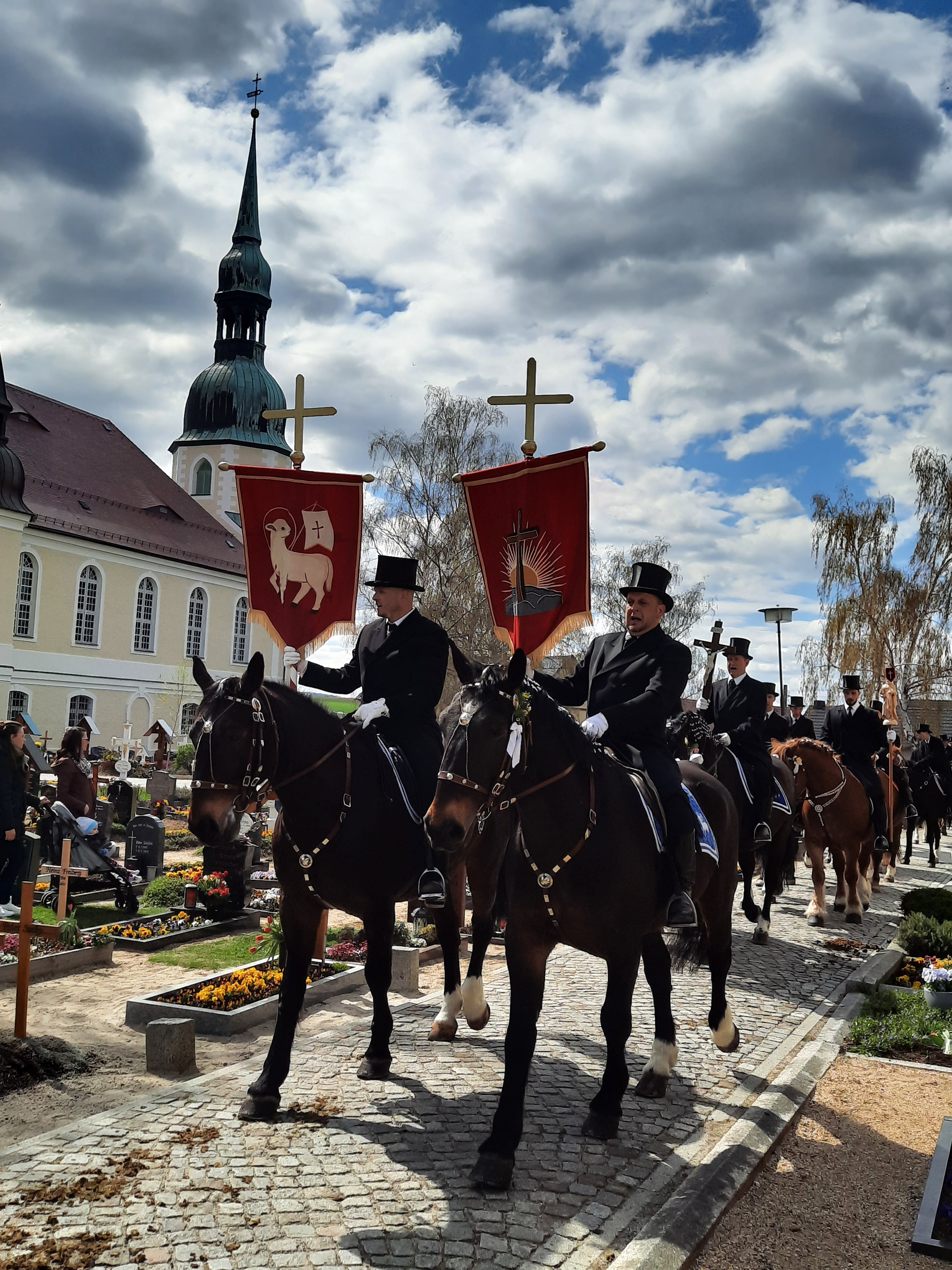
Osterreiter 2022

Before the region was Christianized under Bishop Benno of Meissen, a pagan temple stood on the site of the present church. After the arrival of Christianity, a small wooden church dedicated to the Apostles Simon and Jude Thaddeus was built there.

The parish church St. Simon and Jude Thaddeus (Swj. Symana a Judy Tadeja) was constructed in its present Baroque form between 1769 and 1771 and consecrated on 27 October 1771 by Bishop Jakob Wosky von Bärenstamm, who was born in Crostwitz.

Every year, the church serves as the starting point of an Easter Riders’ (Osterreiten, in Upper Sorbian Jutrowne jěchanje) procession. After attending Easter Mass together, the riders travel via Siebitz to the neighboring municipality of Panschwitz-Kuckau, where they are welcomed by the nuns of St. Marienstern Abbey.

The Sorbian writer Jurij Brězan is buried in the Crostwitz churchyard.

Since 1995, the Crostwitz Passion Play (Chróšćanske pasionske hry) has been performed every ten years.

== Sports ==
The local sports club SG Crostwitz 1981 (Sportowa jednotka Chrósćicy) developed from Serbowka, the oldest Sorbian sports association, founded in 1896, and is now the largest club in the municipality.

Since the 1930s, Crostwitz has had its own football team, Sokoł Chrósćicy. Today, the men's team competes in the Landesklasse league. A women's team also existed until 2014.

== Pilgrimage route ==
The Upper Lusatian section of the Ecumenical Pilgrimage Route (Way of St. James) passes through Crostwitz. It follows the historic route of the Via Regia, running from Lubań (Lauban) through Görlitz, Bautzen, and Kamenz toward Großenhain.
