= RS02 =

RS02 Brockenhexe
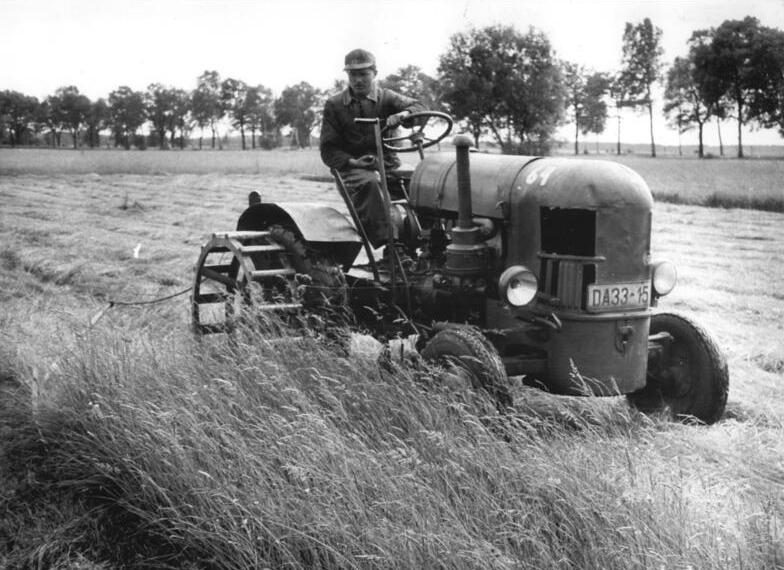
- Brockenhexe in 1956
- Type: Agricultural tractor
- Manufacturer: Schlepperwerk Nordhausen
- Production: 1949 - 1952
- Length: 2980 mm
- Width: 1560 mm
- Height: 2160 mm
- Weight: 1775 kg
- Propulsion: Tyres
- Engine model: Deutz F2M 414
- Gross power: 16,2 kW
- Drawbar pull: 9,61 kN
- Speed: 16,85 km/h
- Succeeded by: RS04

The RS02, brand name Brockenhexe (English: Brocken Witch), is a tractor made by VEB Schlepperwerk Nordhausen alongside the larger tractor RS01. In total, 1935 units of the Brockenhexe were produced from 1949 to 1952. It was available with and without a cab.

== Technical description ==
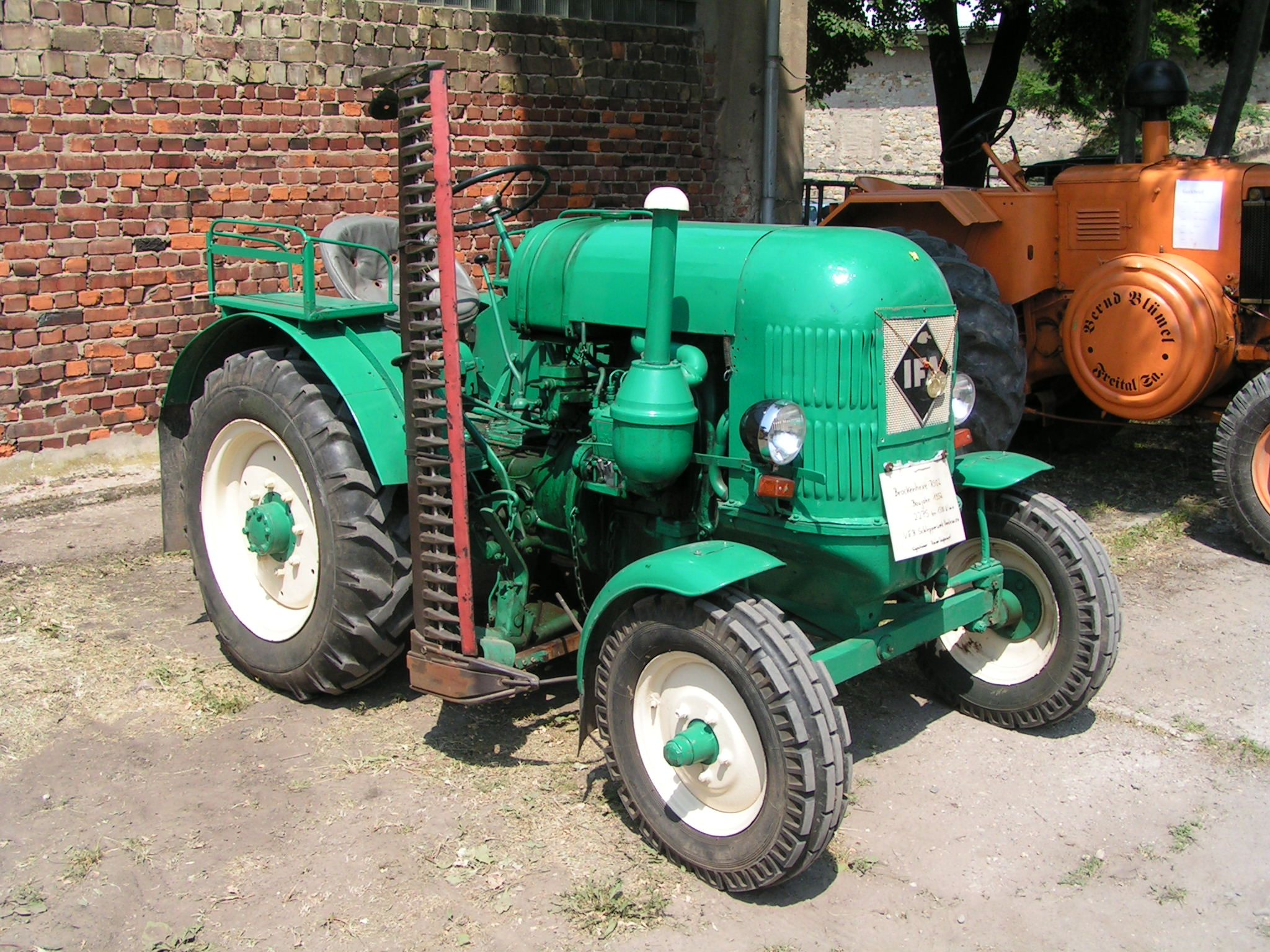
RS02 with mowing bar

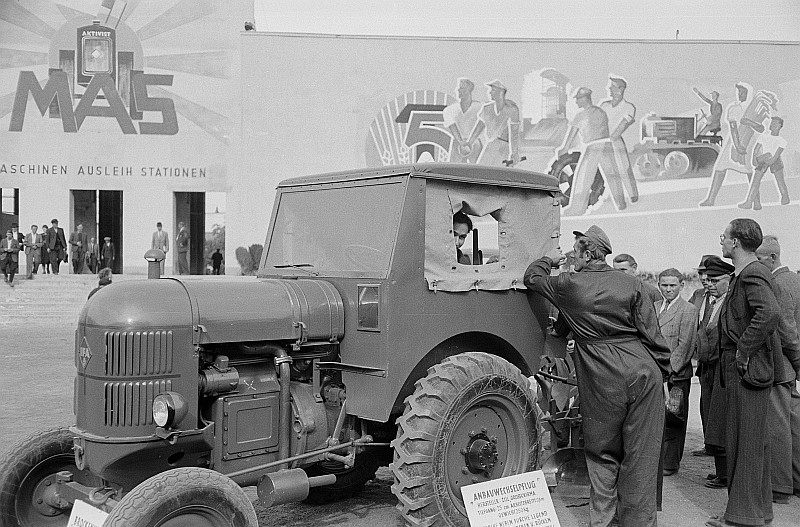
RS02 with cab

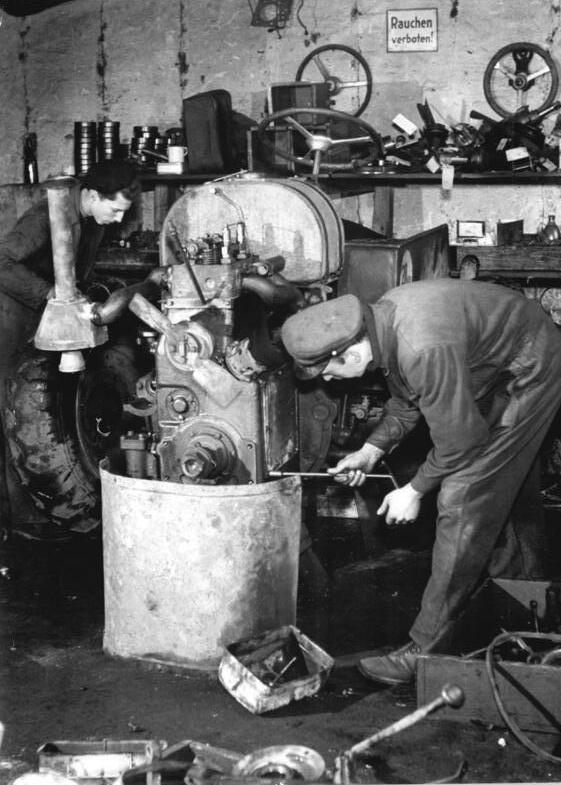
Well visible engine

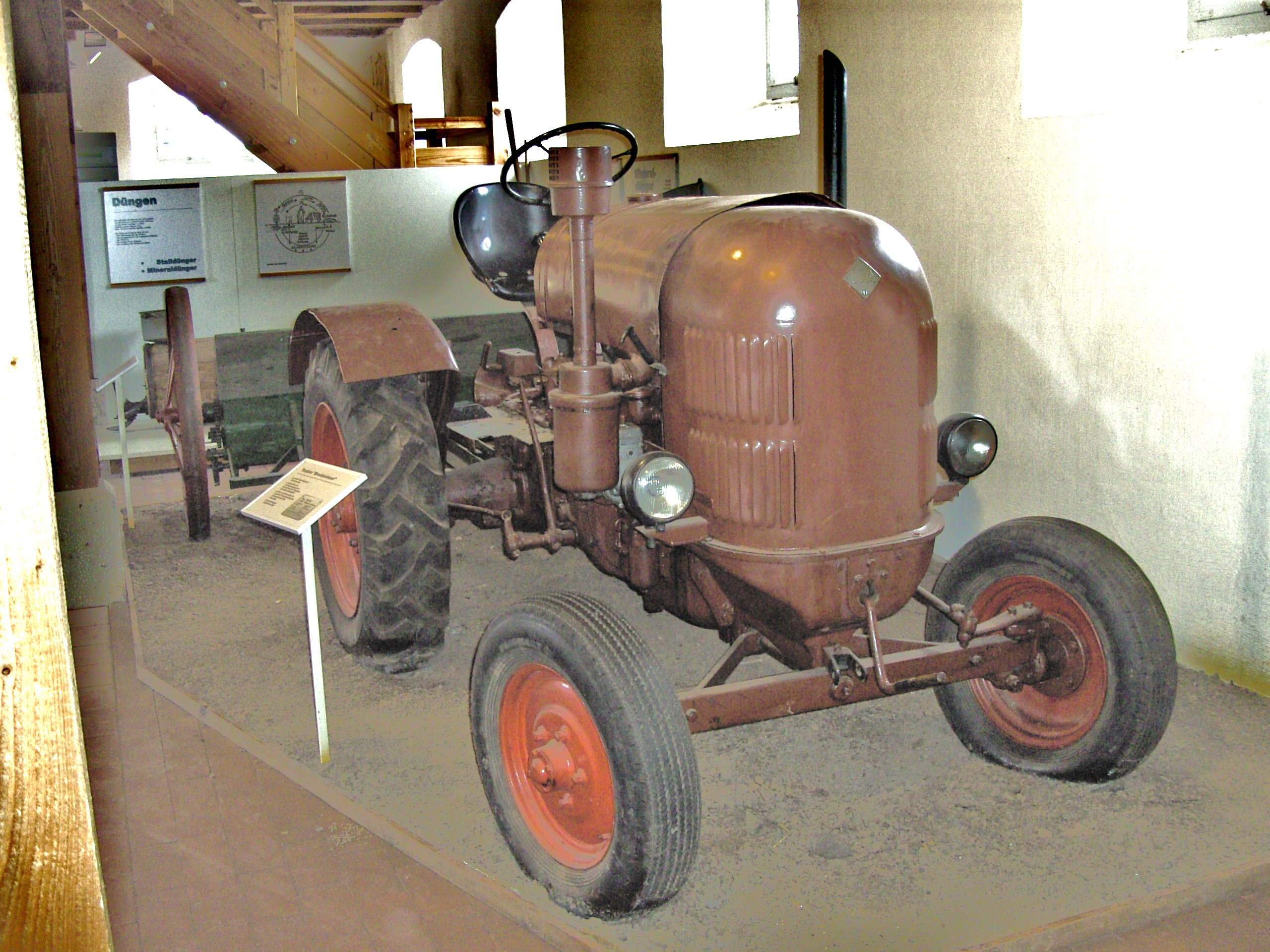
Front of an RS02, well visible front axle

The Brockenhexe utilises a frameless block construction, a dead front beam axle and a rear live axle. Due to the lack of a small DDR-made diesel engine, the Deutz licensed F2M 414 engine was used. The straight two-cylinder, four-stroke diesel engine with water-cooling and prechamer injection, produces 16,2 kW at 1500 min^{−1}; the displacement is 2200 cm^{3}. The engine has a decompression system and a hand crank for starting. The torque is transmitted to the gearbox with a clutch of the type Renak 16K. The gearbox was also built under licence. It is a ZF Friedrichshafen four-speed gearbox with a reverse gear. For braking, drum brakes are used, whereas the hand brake is a gearbox brake. For power take-off, the tractor has a belt-pulley and an engine speed dependent PTO. Some Brockenhexe units were equipped with a cab, some tractors also have a mower bar.

== Technical data ==
Brockenhexe RS02/22
Engine
Name	Deutz F2M 414
Type	Straight two-cylinder, four stroke diesel engine
Cooling system	water-cooling
Injection system	Precombustion chamber injection
Injection pressure	98 bar
Bore × Stroke	100 × 140 mm
Displacement	2200 cm^{3}
Compression ratio	22:1
Rated power	22 PS (16.2 kW) at 1500 min^{−1}
Fuel consumption	299 g/kWh
Powertrain
Torque is transmitted to	Rear tyres
Standard tyres	front: 5,5 - 16 rear: 9 - 24
Clutch	Single disc dry clutch Renak 16K
Gearbox	Four-speed gearbox ZF F12 or ZF A12
Speed in 1st gear	4.68 km/h
Speed in 2nd gear	6.4 km/h
Speed in 3rd gear	10 km/h
Speed in 4th gear	16.85 km/h
Speed in reverse gear	3,8 km/h
Drawbar pull in 1st gear	980 kp (9.61 kN)
Drawbar pull in 2nd gear	700 kp (6.86 kN)
Drawbar pull in 3rd gear	440 kp (4.31 kN)
Drawbar pull in 4th gear	240 kp (2.35 kN)
Dimensions and weight
Length	2980 mm
Width	1560 mm
Height	2160 mm
Weight	1775 kg
Max. weight on the front axle	700 kg
Max. weight on the rear axle	1700 kg
Max. weight	2400 kg
Wheelbase	1750 mm
Turning radius	3650 mm
Track width	1270 mm
Ground clearance	310 mm
Auxiliary drives
PTO	clutch independent, 540 min^{−1}, max. power 11.03 kW
belty-pulley	Diameter: 250 mm, Speed: 1340 min^{−1}
Generator	6V, 80 W

== Bibliography ==
- Achim Bischof: Traktoren in der DDR - Podszun-Verlag, 2004, ISBN 978-3861333487.
