= Jěwa-Marja Čornakec =

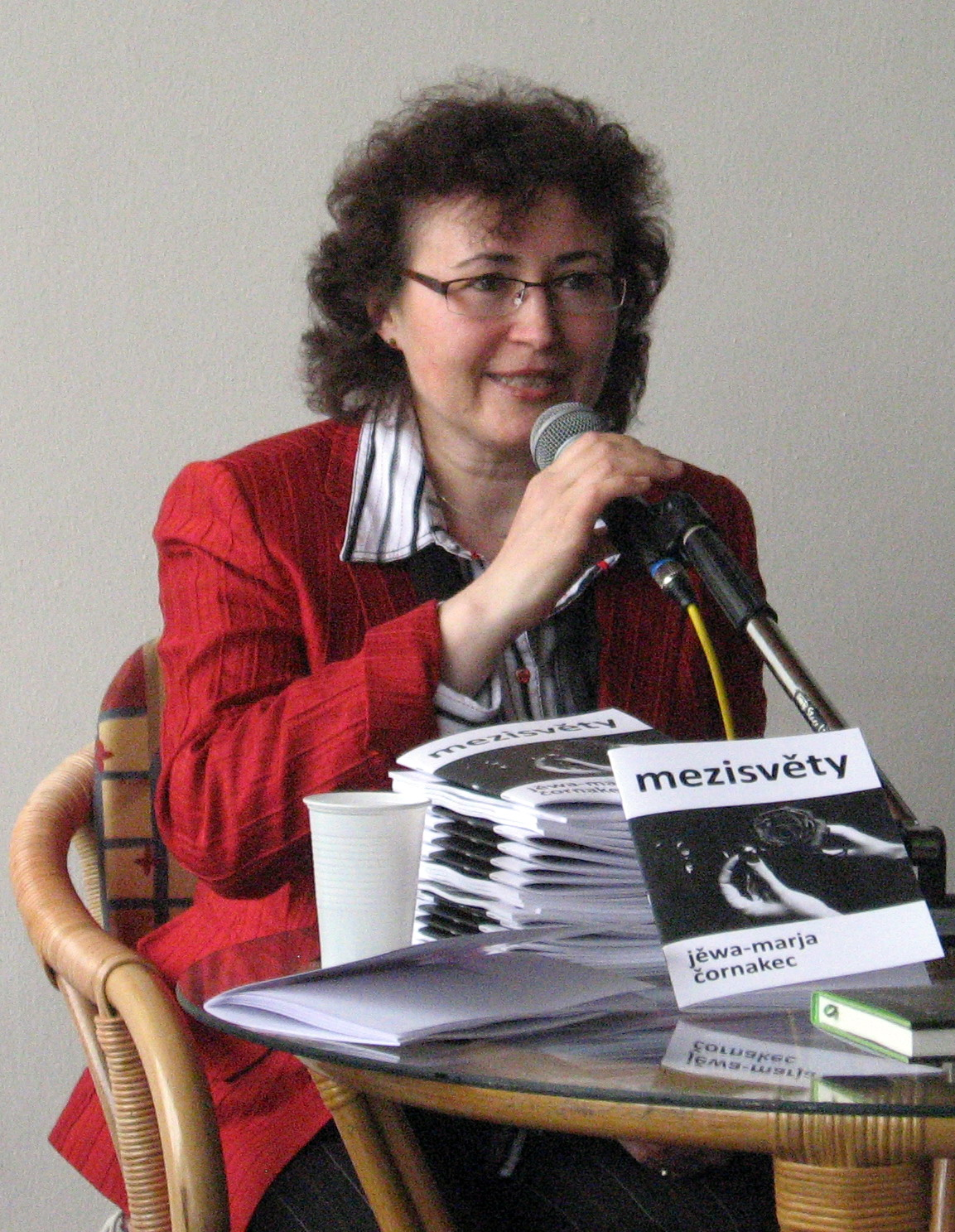
- Jěwa-Marja Čornakec in 2009
- Born: 8 January 1959 (age 67); Räckelwitz, East Germany
- Education: Leipzig University of Applied Sciences
- Occupations: Writer, translator, editor

Jěwa-Marja Čornakec (German: Eva-Maria Zschornack; born 8 January 1959) is a Sorbian–German writer, translator and editor. From 1992 to 2011, she was editor in chief of Rozhlad, a Sorbian cultural magazine.

== Biography ==
Jěwa-Marja Čornakec was born on 8 January 1959 in Räckelwitz and grew up in Ostro (Upper Sorbian: Wostrow). She attended Sorbian Gymnasium in Bautzen, where she graduated in 1977. After studying at the Leipzig University of Applied Sciences in Leipzig, she worked as a librarian at the Sorbian Institute for Teacher's Education in Bautzen from 1980 to 1984. Čornakec then worked for the Sorbian Ethnological Institute of the Academy of Sciences of the GDR. From 1985 to 1990, she studied cultural and Sorbian studies at Leipzig University. Having completed her studies with the thesis Serbske pismowstwo mjez 1937–1945 (Sorbian literature between 1937 and 1945), she returned to the Sorbian Ethnological Institute. On 1 January 1992, she became editor in chief of Rozhlad, the Sorbian cultural magazine, a position she held until 1 August 2011, when she became a dramaturge at Sorbische National-Ensemble in Bautzen. She now lives in Dresden.

Jěwa-Marja Čornakec is a member of the Maćica Serbska and was elected a member of its executive board on 29 March 2008.

== Literary works ==
In the 1980's, Čornakec started to create short prose in Upper Sorbian and German published in various anthologies and magazines. Later, she focused on children's literature, publishing children's books in Sorbian, and children's musical libretti for the Sorbian-National-Ensemble. On 1 March 2009 her first play, W sćinje swěčki ('In the shadow of the candle'), premiered at Deutsch-Sorbisches Volkstheater Bautzen. Additionally, she translates 19th century Sorbian poems into German.

== Prizes ==
On 4 July 2011 she received the Ćišinski Promotion Prize from the Foundation for the Sorbian People for her Sorbian plays and children's books.

== Selected works ==
=== Children's books ===
- Potajnstwo zeleneho kamjenja (in Upper Sorbian). Bautzen: Domowina-Verlag, 1994. ISBN 978-3-7420-1596-9.
- Matej w štwórtej dimensiji(in Upper Sorbian). Bautzen: Domowina-Verlag, 1996. ISBN 978-3-7420-1657-7.
- Myška w mróčelach (in Upper Sorbian). Bautzen: Domowina-Verlag, 2001. ISBN 978-3-7420-1874-8.
- Zakuzłana sroka (in Upper Sorbian). Bautzen: Domowina-Verlag, 2004. ISBN 978-3-7420-1975-2.
- Kak je wroblik Frido lětaś nawuknuł. Bautzen: Domowina-Verlag, 2006. ISBN 978-3-7420-2050-5 (in Upper Sorbian). ISBN 978-3-7420-2041-3 (in Lower Sorbian).
- Kak je myška Pip-pip płuwać nawuknyła. Bautzen: Domowina-Verlag, 2007. ISBN 978-3-7420-2083-3 (in Upper Sorbian). ISBN 978-3-7420-2084-0 (in Lower Sorbian).
- Kak je žabka Šlapka spěšnje skakać nawuknyła. Bautzen: Domowina-Verlag, 2008. ISBN 978-3-7420-2103-8 (in Upper Sorbian). ISBN 978-3-7420-2104-5 (in Lower Sorbian).
- Kak je jěžik Kałačik skónčnje spać nawuknył. Bautzen: Domowina-Verlag, 2009. ISBN 978-3-7420-2133-5 (in Upper Sorbian). ISBN 978-3-7420-2134-2 (in Lower Sorbian).
- Zmiječk Paliwak (in Upper Sorbian). Bautzen: Domowina-Verlag, 2010. ISBN 978-3-7420-2169-4.
- Wroblik Frido a jeho přećeljo (in Upper Sorbian). Bautzen: Domowina-Verlag, 2011. ISBN 978-3-7420-2205-9.
- Kak su šwjerce kólasowaś nawuknuli, Domowina-Verlag, Bautzen 2011, ISBN 978-3-7420-2204-2
- Kak je žabka Šlapka z wětřikom lećała. Bautzen: Domowina-Verlag, 2014. ISBN 978-3-7420-2288-2 (in Upper Sorbian). ISBN 978-3-7420-2289-9 (in Lower Sorbian).
- Kak su wroblik Frido a jeho přećeljo do Afriki lećeć chcyli, Bautzen 2016, ISBN 978-3-7420-2369-8 (in Upper Sorbian). ISBN 978-3-7420-2370-4 (in Lower Sorbian).
- Kak su wroblik Frido a jeho přećeljo jutry zaječki překwapili (in Upper Sorbian). Bautzen: Domowina-Verlag, 2020. ISBN 978-3-7420-2604-0.

=== Books for young people ===
- Łójerjo sonow (in Upper Sorbian). Bautzen: Domowina-Verlag. 2018. ISBN 978-3-7420-2464-0.

=== Children's musicals (Libretti) ===
- Ein Traum vom Fliegen, 2001
- Die gestohlene Krone, 2003
- Der Traum von Glück, 2004
- Der kleine Drache Paliwak, 2009
- Wo ist Milenka?, 2012

=== Prose ===
- Hołbik čornej nóžce ma (in Upper Sorbian). Bautzen: Domowina-Verlag. 1999. ISBN 978-3-7420-1792-5.

=== Plays ===
- W sćinje swěčki, premiered on 21 March 2009 at Deutsch-Sorbischen Volkstheater Bautzen (Domowina-Verlag, Bautzen 2009. ISBN 978-3-7420-2128-1)
  - German version: Im Schatten der Kerze, premiered on 18 September 2009 at Deutsch-Sorbischen Volkstheater Bautzen
- Za sydom durjemi (German: Sieben Türen), premiered on 17 March 2012 on Deutsch-Sorbischen Volkstheater Bautzen
- Chodźić po rukomaj – Alois Andritzki (German: Auf Händen gehen – Alois Andritzki), musical play (Musik: Ulrich Pogoda), premiered on 12 April 2014 at Deutsch-Sorbischen Volkstheater Bautzen
- Mór a lubosć (German: Pest und Liebe), premiered on 10 September 2022 at Pfarrwiese, Crostwitz

=== Nonfiction ===
- Kleine sorbische Ostereierfibel (in German) (9th ed.). Bautzen: Domowina-Verlag. 2019. ISBN 978-3-7420-1908-0.
