= Nebelschütz =

Nebelschütz Njebjelčicy
- Municipality
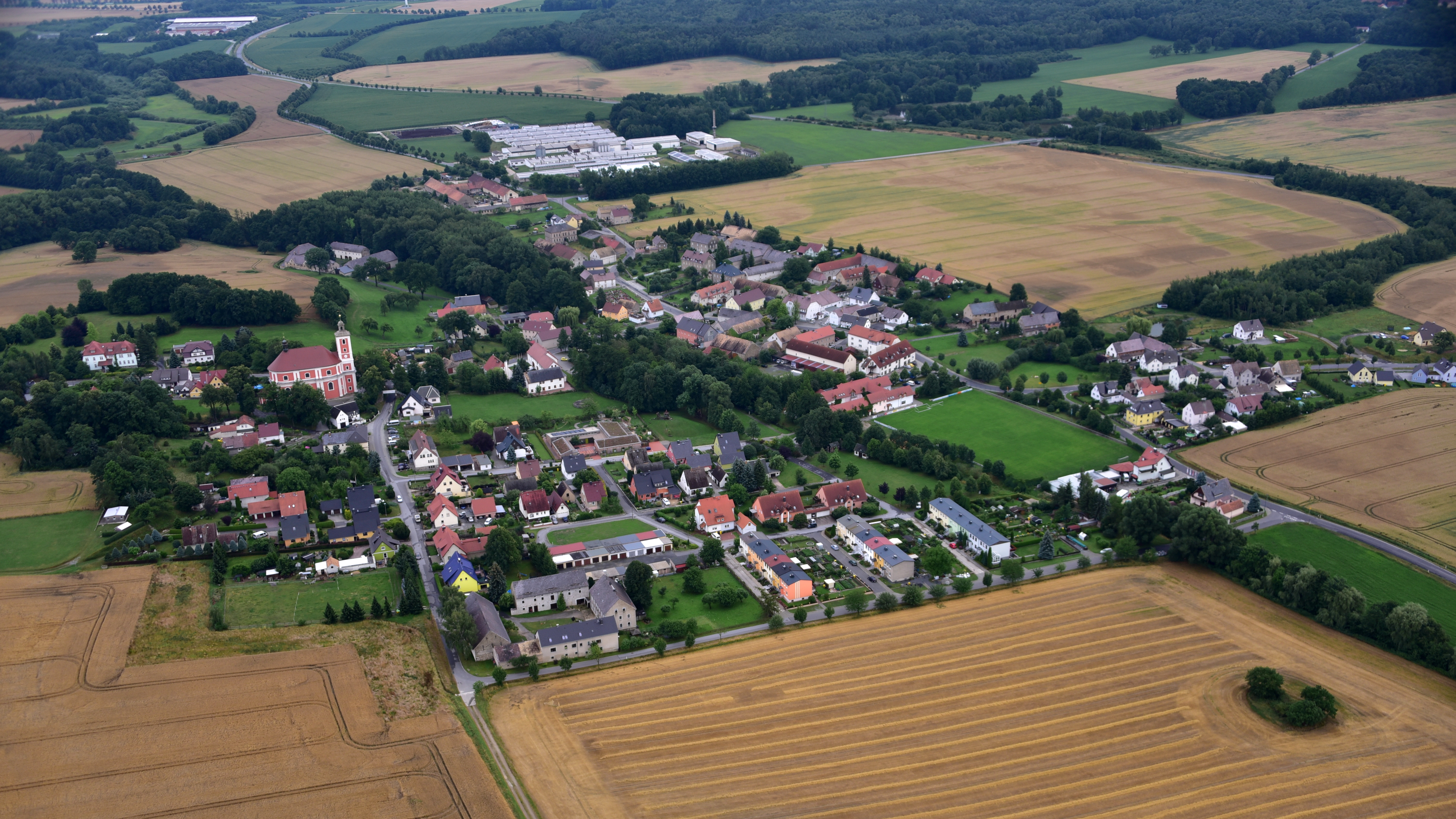
- Aerial view

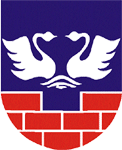
- Coat of arms

- Location of Nebelschütz within Bautzen district
- Interactive map of Nebelschütz
- Location within Germany Location within Saxony
- Coordinates: 51°16′N 14°10′E
- Country: Germany
- State: Saxony
- District: Bautzen
- Municipal assoc.: Am Klosterwasser
- Subdivisions: 5

Government
  - Mayor (2022–29): André Bulang

Area
  - Total: 22.92 km^{2} (8.85 sq mi)
- Elevation: 194 m (636 ft)

Population (2025-12-31)
  - Total: 1,149
  - Density: 50.13/km^{2} (129.8/sq mi)
- Demonym(s): German: Nebelschützer; Upper Sorbian: Njebjelčan (m.), Njebjelčanka (f.)
- Time zone: UTC+01:00 (CET)
  - Summer (DST): UTC+02:00 (CEST)
- Postal codes: 01920
- Dialling codes: 03578
- Vehicle registration: BZ, BIW, HY, KM
- Website: www.nebelschuetz.de

Nebelschütz (German) or Njebjelčicy (Upper Sorbian) is a Sorbian village in the district of Bautzen of Saxony in eastern Germany. It lies to the south-east of Kamenz.

The municipality is part of the recognized Sorbian settlement area in Saxony. Upper Sorbian has an official status next to German, all villages bear names in both languages. In 2004, two thirds of the population spoke Sorbian.

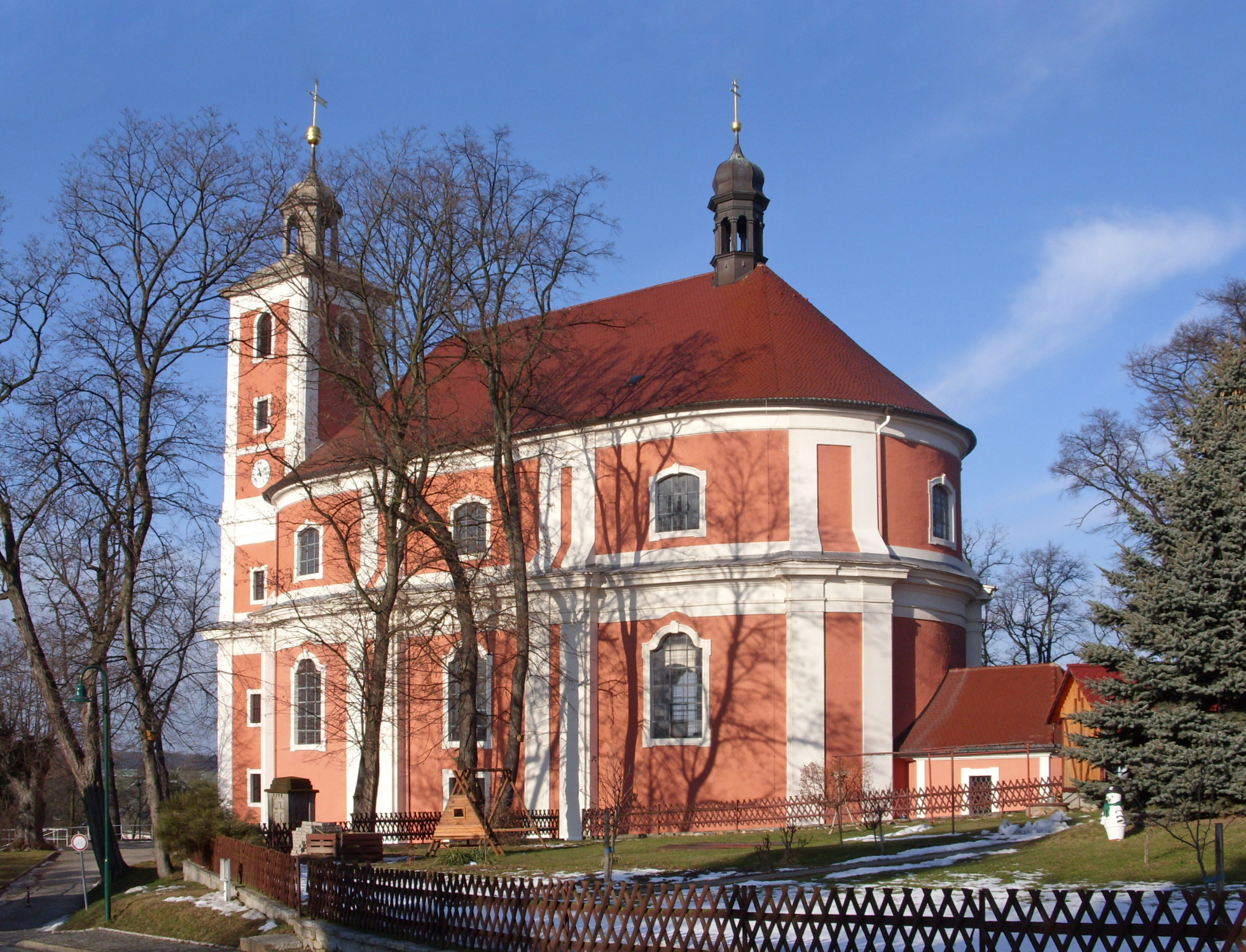
Saint Martin Church

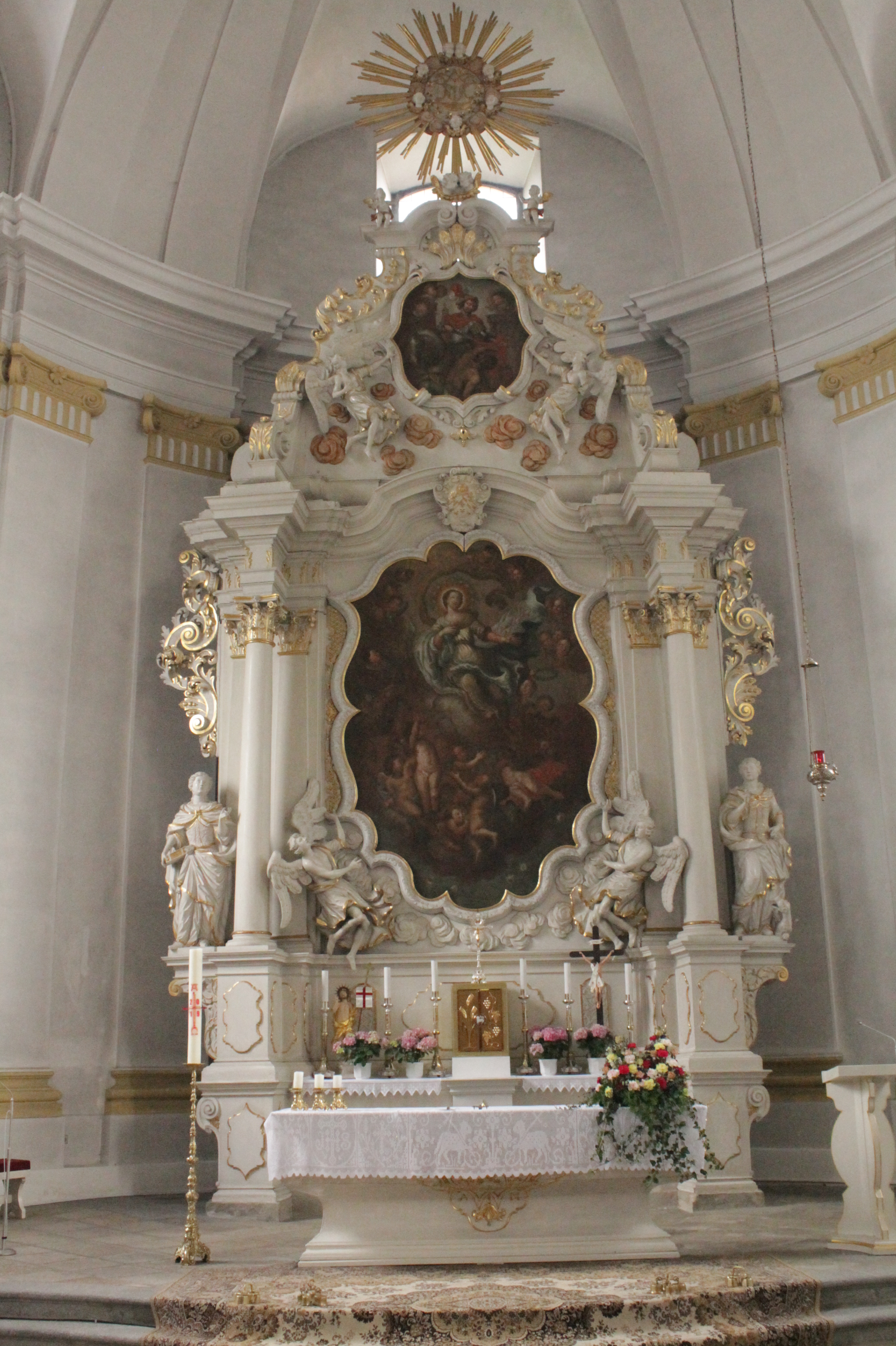
The Baroque altarpiece of St Martin's

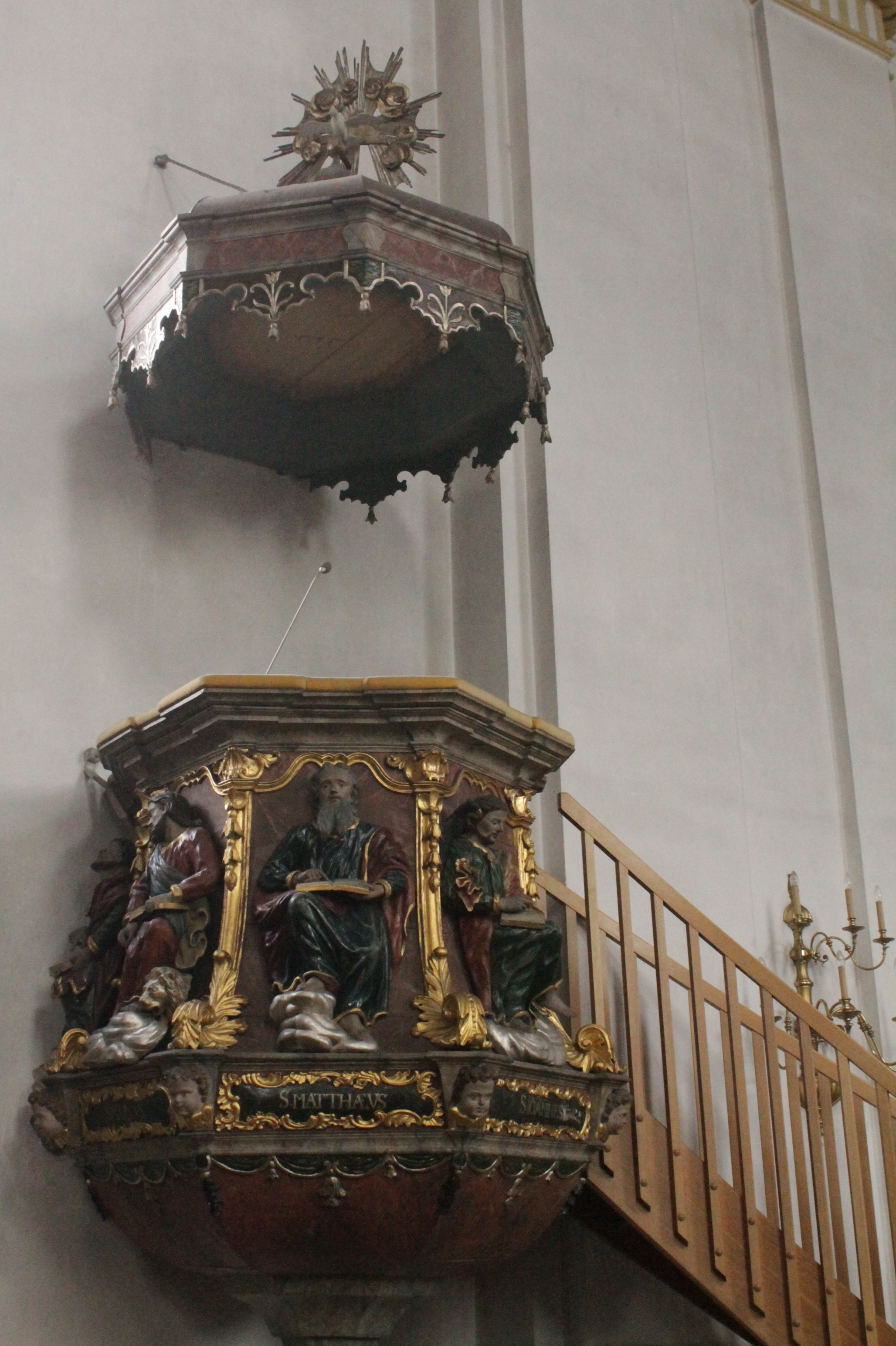
Pulpit of St Martin's Church, Nebelschütz

In the town stands the Baroque church of Saint Martin, which stands on higher ground. Whilst mildly impressive from the outside, the church is more noted for its historical interior. Saint Martin Church has a combination of both pulpit and altar, reflecting the Catholic majority within the Sorbian area.

== History ==
The village is first mentioned in 1304 in a document written in the nearby monastery of Panschwitz-Kuckau. The local church was founded by 1346 as a filial church of the parish in Kamenz (Kamjenc), when it was part of the Czech (Bohemian) Crown Lands. In 1880, the village had a population of 271, 90,4% Sorbs.

== Twin cities ==
- Hlučín, Moravian–Silesian Region, Czech Republic
