= RS01 =

Family of tractors

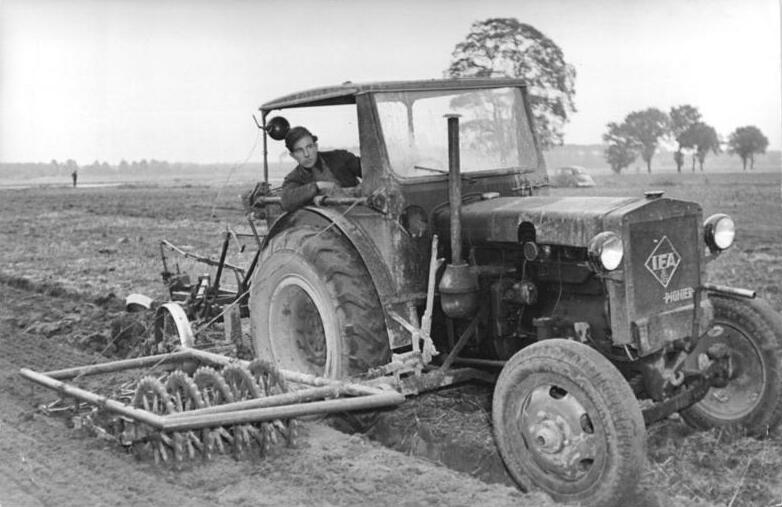
- RS01 in 1952
- Type: Agricultural tractor
- Manufacturer: Schlepperwerk Nordhausen; Horch
- Production: 1949 - 1958
- Length: 3650 mm
- Width: 1720 mm
- Height: 2200 mm
- Weight: 3300 kg
- Propulsion: Tyres
- Engine model: 4F 145
- Gross power: 29 - 31 kW
- Drawbar pull: 19.07 kN
- Speed: 17.5 km/h
- Preceded by: FAMO XL
- Succeeded by: RS14

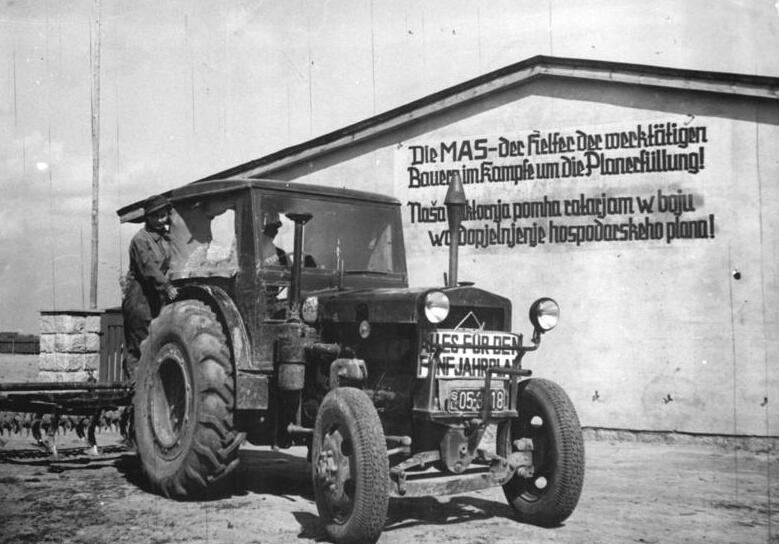
Pionier of the german-sorbian MAS in Panschwitz

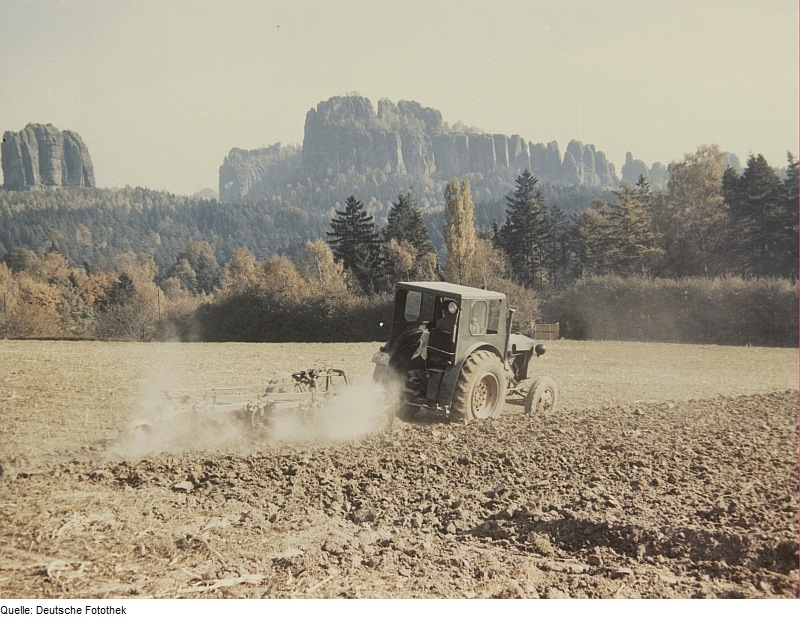
RS01 Pionier ploughing

The tractor RS01 with the brand name Pionier (english: Pioneer) is the first tractor produced in the GDR. Production started in 1949 in the VEB Horch Kraftfahrzeug- und Motorenwerke Zwickau plant, the production was moved to the newly founded VEB Schlepperwerk Nordhausen in 1950. The RS01 is based on the FAMO XL, which was produced before World War II by FAMO.

== The Pionier RS01/40 ==
After the construction plans of the FAMO XL tractor were revised and optimized for the given production capabilities by former FAMO engineers in Schönebeck, the Horch plant in Zwickau started the production of the RS01 in 1949 because the tractor plant in Schönebeck did not have enough production capability. The first RS01 was shown to the public at the Leipzig Trade Fair in 1949 with a FAMO logo at the grille. 2250 tractors were produced from 1949 to 1950. In 1950, the production was moved to the tractor plant Nordhausen, the tractor was renamed: RS01 Pionier. It was produced until 1956. Starting in 1957, the tractor was revised. The new name was RS01 Harz. The production of the Harz ended in 1958, when 2175 Harz-tractors had been produced. This caused a gap in the 30-kW-class. In 1966 the RS14/40 filled the gap as the successor of the Harz.

== Technical description ==
The RS01 uses a frameless block construction with a rigid rear axle and a front swing axle with leaf springs. Engines of the type 4F 145 BE were used, they are water-cooled inline four cylinder four stroke diesel engines with prechamber injection and five litres of displacement. The rated power is 29.4 kW. These engines were started using a crank and petrol, they were switched to diesel fuel afterwards. The torque is transmitted to the mechanical five speed gearbox with a single disc dry clutch; only the rear wheels are driven. They are equipped with drum brakes, the handbrake is a gear box brake. For power take-off, the RS01 has a clutch dependent PTO. A belt pulley was also available for the RS01. Starting in 1953, the prechamber engine was replaced with a swirl chamber engine, which was started using compressed air.

The Harz-tractor is an optimized model of the Pionier. It has a new swirl chamber engine producing 31 kW, which was started with an electric 24 volts starter motor. The gearbox was replaced with a different model and an oil-hydraulic hitch was placed in the back of the tractor.

== Technical specifications ==
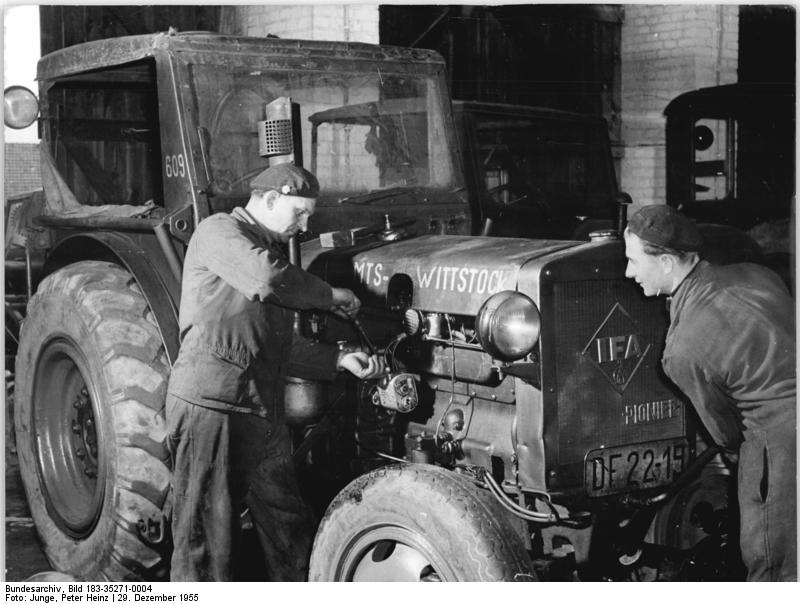
RS01 maintenance, december 1955

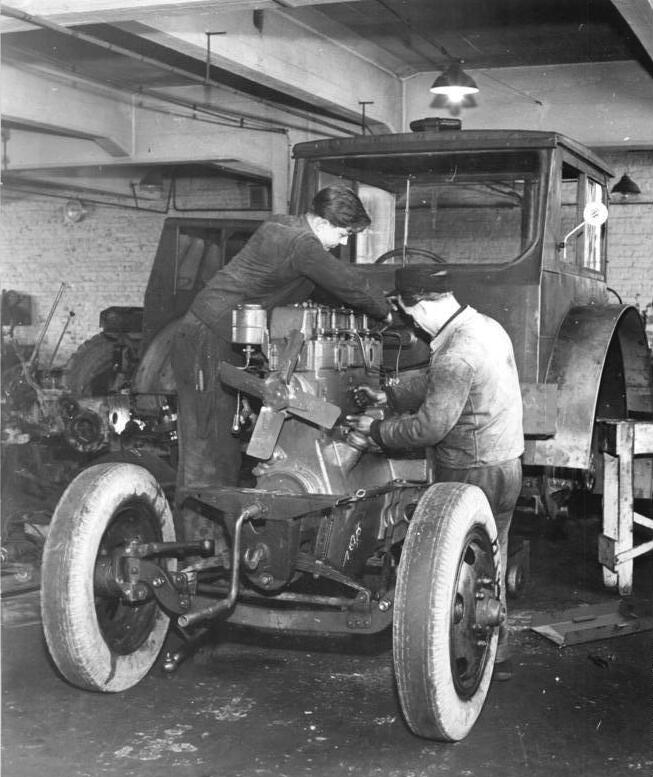
Well visible engine

	RS01/40 Pionier		RS01/40 Harz
Engine
Prdocution	1949 - 1953	1953 - 1956	1957 - 1958
Engine	4F 145 BE	4F 145 DL	4F 145 DE
engine type	four stroke diesel		
Cooling system	water circulation cooling		
Engine starting system	Petrol and hand crank	Compressed air	Electric motor
Fuel injection	Prechamber	Swirl chamber	
Injection pump	IFA EP 453	IFA DEP B S-171	
Injection pressure	98 bar		
Compression	17:1		
Bore × Stroke	105 × 145 mm		
Displacement	5022 cm^{3}		
Rated power at 1250 min^{−1}	29.4 kW		30.9 kW
Torque at 1250 min^{−1}	225 N·m		236 N·m
Fuel consumption	320 g/kWh		
Powertrain
Torque is transmitted to	rear tyres		
Tyres	front: 6.5 - 20" AS rear: 12.75 - 28" AS		
Clutch	Renak PF 28K		
Gearbox	Manual five-speed gearbox with reverse gear		
Speeds in km/h
1. Gear	3.8		3,65
2. Gear	5.0		4,82
3. Gear	6.0		5,83
4. Gear	9.5		9,26
5. Gear	17.5		17,25
R. Gear	3.0		2,81
Drawbar pull	On asphalt: 19.07 kN; On dirt: 15.39 kN		
Dimensions and weight
Length	3650 mm		3390 mm
Width	1720 mm		1725 mm
Height	2200 mm		2395 mm
Wheelbase	2080 mm		
Ground clearance	300 mm		325 mm
track width	front: 1290 mm rear: 1390 mm		
Turning radius with steering brake	4500 mm		?
Weight	3300 mm		
Maximum weight	3700 mm		
Max. axle loads	front: 1200 kg rear: 2500 kg		
Power take-off and other devices
PTO	PTO clutch-dependent, 540 min^{−1}		
Belt pulley	available		not available
Hydraulic system	not available		three-point-hitch
Generator	12 V, 130 W		
Battery	lead-acid		
Starter motor	none		24 V, 2942 W

== Bibliography ==
- Achim Bischof: Traktoren in der DDR - Podszun-Verlag, 2004, ISBN 978-3861333487.
