= Erhan Albayrak =

Turkish footballer and manager

Personal information
- Date of birth: 5 April 1977 (age 49)
- Place of birth: Hamburg, West Germany
- Height: 1.83 m (6 ft 0 in)
- Position: Midfielder

Youth career
- –1990: FC Süderelbe
- 1990–1993: Hamburger SV
- 1993–1995: Werder Bremen

Senior career*
Years	Team	Apps	(Gls)
1995–1996	Werder Bremen	2	(0)
1996–1998	Kocaelispor	49	(11)
1998–2001	Gaziantepspor	78	(18)
2001–2002	Arminia Bielefeld	43	(9)
2003	Fenerbahçe	9	(0)
2004	Ankaragücü	11	(3)
2004–2006	Konyaspor	65	(5)
2006–2007	Çaykur Rizespor	18	(0)
2007–2008	Ankaraspor	28	(2)
2008–2009	Konyaspor	17	(1)
2009–2011	KFC Uerdingen 05	49	(26)
2011	TuRU Düsseldorf		
2011	Türkischer SV Wiesbaden		
2012	FC Sylt	11	(5)
2012	FC Süderelbe		
2013	Niendorfer TSV	4	(0)
2014	VfB Nordmark Flensburg		
2015–2016	Harburger TB		

International career
1994–1996	Turkey U18	14	(2)
1998–2000	Turkey U21	24	(7)

Managerial career
- 2012: KFC Uerdingen 05
- 2012–2014: FC St. Pauli (youth)
- 2014: KFC Uerdingen 05
- 2016: FC Türkiye Wilhelmsburg
- 2016–2017: Rot Weiss Ahlen
- 2018: FSV Duisburg
- * Club domestic league appearances and goals

Erhan Albayrak (born 5 April 1977) is a Turkish football manager and former player last managed FSV Duisburg.

== Career ==
Grown up in the Hamburg quarter of Fischbek he played for the local club FC Süderelbe until he was 13 years old. Subsequently, he ran through the youth teams of Hamburger SV and Werder Bremen. His first appearance in the Bundesliga he also made for Werder in a 1–1 draw against Fortuna Düsseldorf on 11 August 1995, when he was just 18 years old.

Albayrak also played for Ankaragücü, Çaykur Rizespor, Fenerbahçe, Gaziantepspor, Kocaelispor, Ankaraspor in Turkey and Arminia Bielefeld in Germany. He has played as midfielder for Konyaspor in the Süper Lig. In December 2009, after seven years spent in Turkey, he returned to his native Germany and signed for KFC Uerdingen. He later played for FC Sylt.

Along with Ronny Kockel he was the manager of KFC Uerdingen 05 at the end of the 2011–12 season. In March 2014 he became the manager of the club once again. After just few weeks in the job he was sacked on 14 April 2014.

== Honours ==
Kocaelispor

- Turkish Cup: 1997
