= Am Klosterwasser =

- Verwaltungsverband
- Location of Am Klosterwasser within Bautzen district
- Interactive map of Am Klosterwasser
- Location within Germany Location within Saxony
- Coordinates: 51°14′N 14°12′E
- Country: Germany
- State: Saxony
- District: Bautzen
- Seat: Panschwitz-Kuckau
- Subdivisions: 5 municipalities

Area
  - Total: 102.86 km^{2} (39.71 sq mi)

Population (2025-12-31)
  - Total: 7,051
  - Density: 68.55/km^{2} (177.5/sq mi)
- Time zone: UTC+01:00 (CET)
  - Summer (DST): UTC+02:00 (CEST)
- Website: www.am-klosterwasser.de

Am Klosterwasser (Upper Sorbian: Při Klóšterskej wodźe) is a Verwaltungsverband in the district of Bautzen in Saxony, Germany. The seat of the Verwaltungsverband is in Panschwitz-Kuckau.

The Verwaltungsverband Am Klosterwasser consists of the following municipalities:

1. Crostwitz (Chrósćicy)
2. Nebelschütz (Njebjelćicy)
3. Panschwitz-Kuckau^{1} (Pančicy-Kukow)
4. Räckelwitz (Worklecy)
5. Ralbitz-Rosenthal (Ralbicy-Róžant)
