= Ronny Kockel =

German footballer (born 1975)

Personal information
- Date of birth: 16 December 1975 (age 50)
- Place of birth: Räckelwitz, East Germany
- Height: 1.88 m (6 ft 2 in)
- Position: Goalkeeper

Senior career*
Years	Team	Apps	(Gls)
1995–1999	VfR Pforzheim		
1999	SV Sandhausen	2	(0)
2000	VfB Gaggenau		
2000–2001	TSF Ditzingen	30	(0)
2001–2002	Stuttgarter Kickers	17	(0)
2002–2004	VfV Hildesheim	21	(0)
2004–2005	Arminia Bielefeld II	25	(0)
2005–2006	Olympiakos Nicosia	0	(0)
2006–2007	Eintracht Trier	13	(0)
2008	Paykan	8	(0)
2009	VfR Mannheim	14	(0)
2009–2011	KFC Uerdingen 05	21	(0)

Managerial career
- 2012: KFC Uerdingen 05
- * Club domestic league appearances and goals

Ronny Kockel (born 16 December 1975) is a German former professional footballer who played as a goalkeeper.

== Playing career ==
Kockel was born in Räckelwitz. On 2 January 2008, he signed for Iran Pro League side Paykan F.C. on a six-month contract, becoming the first German professional footballer in Iran.

== Post-playing career ==
On 3 December 2009, Kockel worked in the marketing department of his club KFC Uerdingen. On 26 May 2012, he was named the successor of Jörg Jung as head coach alongside Erhan Albayrak.
