= Jurij Brězan =

German writer

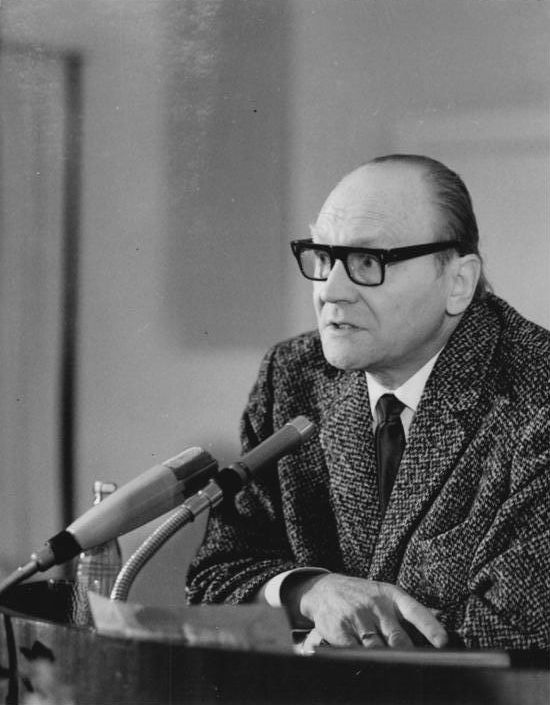
- Jurij Brězan in 1967
- Born: 9 June 1916; Räckelwitz / Worklecy, Saxony, Germany
- Died: 12 March 2006 (aged 89); Kamenz / Kamjenc, Saxony, Germany
- Occupation: Bilingual Writer
- Political party: SED

Jurij Brězan (9 June 1916 – 12 March 2006) was a Sorbian writer. His works, especially the novels, narrative works and children's books, were available in the two languages German and Upper Sorbian.

He lived, following its creation during and after 1945, in the German Democratic Republic (East Germany).

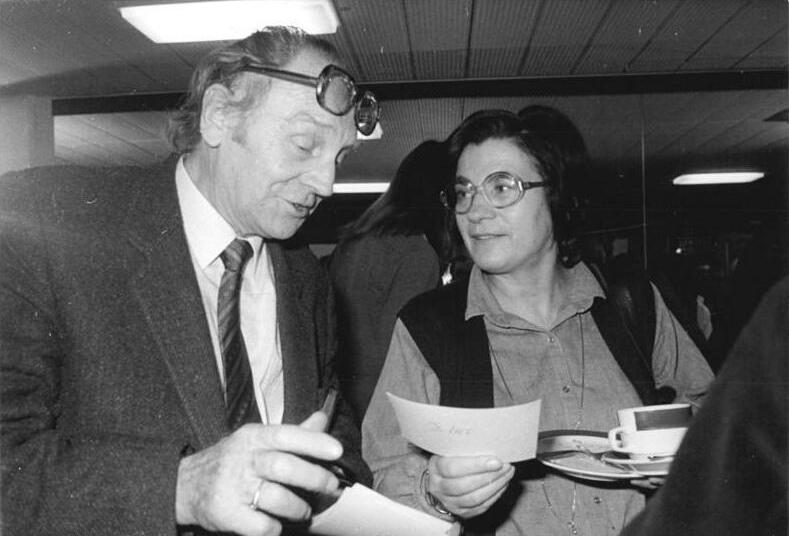
Jurij Brězan with Christa Wolf in 1981

== Life and work ==
Brězan was born in Räckelwitz in Upper Lusatia, the son of a quarry worker and smallholder. He had three younger sisters whose insatiable appetite for new stories encouraged him to exercise his narrative talents from an early age. He attended school in Bautzen and then studied political economics. However, he was excluded from his studies in 1936.

After 1933, he worked illegally for Domowina and was active in a Sorbian resistance group. Domowina was closed down by government in 1937, and in 1937–38, Brězan emigrated to Prague. After his return, he was arrested and was held in prison in 1938–39. From 1942 to 1944, he was a soldier in the Wehrmacht and became a prisoner of war with the Americans.

Between 1945 and 1948, he was a youth official for the Domowina. In 1946, he joined the Socialist Unity Party. After 1949, he worked as a freelance writer. In 1946, he became a member of the German PEN-Zentrum East and West, in 1965 a member of the Akademie der Künste. Between 1969 and 1989 he was vice-president of the writers union of East Germany. He lived near his birthplace until his death in Kamenz.

He was frequently honored in Communist East Germany, receiving the National Prize of East Germany in 1951, 1964 and 1976; the literature and art prize of the Domowina in 1973, the Order of Karl Marx in 1974, and the Vaterländischer Verdienstorden in 1981.

== Works ==
Many of his novels and stories have autobiographical elements. His best known of such works is the novel trilogy of Der Gymnasiast (1959), "Semester der verlorenen Zeit (1959) and Mannesjahre (1964).

Other works use elements from the rich folklore of Upper Lusatia.

- 52 Wochen sind ein Jahr (Novel, 1953)
- Christa (Story, 1957)
- Der Gymnasiast (Novel, 1958)
- Borbas und die Rute Gottes (Story, 1959)
- Semester der verlorenen Zeit (Novel, 1960)
- Mannesjahre (Novel, 1964)
- Der Elefant und die Pilze (Children's book, 1964)
- Die Reise nach Krakau (1966)
- Die Abenteuer des Kater Mikosch (Children's book, 1967)
- Die Schwarze Mühle (Story, 1968)
- Krabat oder Die Verwandlung der Welt (Novel, 1976)
- Der Brautschmuck (Stories, 1979)
- Bild des Vaters (Novel, 1983)
- Dalmat hat Ferien (Children's book, 1985)
- Wie das Lachen auf die Welt kam (Stories, 1986)
- Einsichten und Ansichten (1986)
- Geschichten vom Wasser (Stories, 1988)
- Mein Stück Zeit (Autobiographical report, 1989)
- Bruder Baum und Schwester Lärche (1991)
- Das wunderschöne blaue Pferd (1991)
- Krabat oder Die Bewahrung der Welt (Novel, 1993)
- Rifko – aus dem Tagebuch eines Dackels (Children's book, 1994)
- Die Leute von Salow (Novel, 1997)
- Ohne Pass und Zoll (Autobiographical report, 1999)
- Die grüne Eidechse (Novel, 2001)
- Hunds Tagebuch (Story, 2001)
