= Ralbitz-Rosenthal =

Ralbitz-Rosenthal/Ralbicy-Róžant
- Municipality
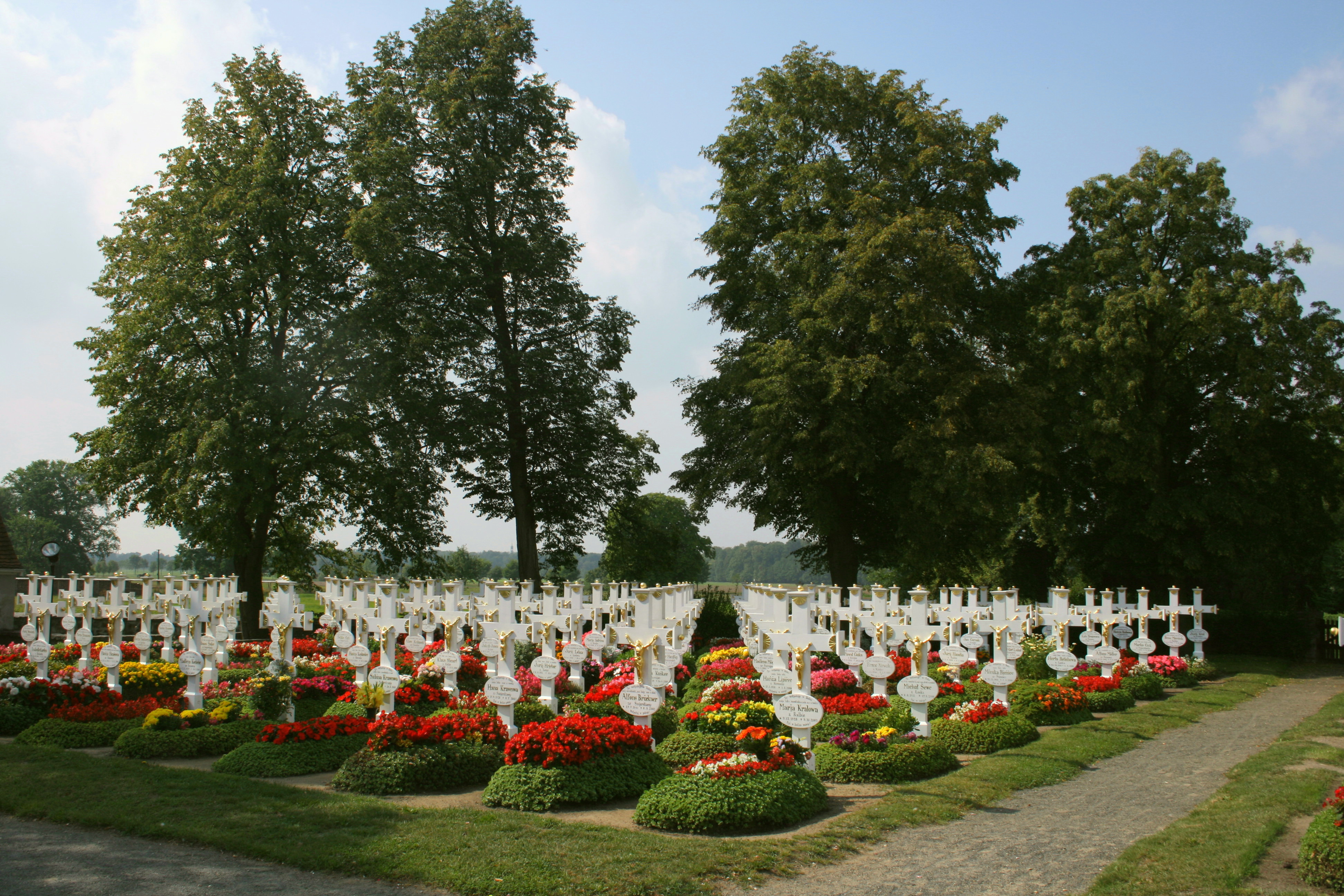
- Cemetery in Ralbitz

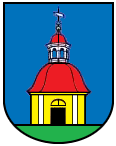
- Coat of arms

- Location of Ralbitz-Rosenthal/Ralbicy-Róžant within Bautzen district
- Interactive map of Ralbitz-Rosenthal/Ralbicy-Róžant
- Location within Germany Location within Saxony
- Coordinates: 51°17′30″N 14°14′30″E
- Country: Germany
- State: Saxony
- District: Bautzen
- Municipal assoc.: Am Klosterwasser
- Subdivisions: 10

Government
  - Mayor (2022–29): Hubertus Rietscher

Area
  - Total: 31.69 km^{2} (12.24 sq mi)
- Elevation: 143 m (469 ft)

Population (2025-12-31)
  - Total: 1,725
  - Density: 54.43/km^{2} (141.0/sq mi)
- Time zone: UTC+01:00 (CET)
  - Summer (DST): UTC+02:00 (CEST)
- Postal codes: 01920
- Dialling codes: 035796
- Vehicle registration: BZ, BIW, HY, KM
- Website: www.ralbitz-rosenthal.de

Ralbitz-Rosenthal (German) or Ralbicy-Róžant (Upper Sorbian, pronounced [ˈʁalbʲitsɨ ˈʁʊʒant]) is a municipality in the district of Bautzen, in Saxony, Germany. Rosenthal is a well known pilgrimage site, dedicated to the Blessed Virgin Mary and administered by the Order of Cistercians.

The municipality belongs to Upper Lusatia and is located in the central settlement area of the Sorbs. It consists of following villages (names given in German/Upper Sorbian, followed by the number of inhabitants):

- Cunnewitz/Konjecy, 268 inh.
- Gränze/Hrajnca, 54 inh.
- Laske/Łask, 85 inh.
- Naußlitz/Nowoslicy, 121 inh.
- Neu-Schmerlitz/Nowa Smjerdźaca, 1 inh.
- Ralbitz/Ralbicy, 333 inh.
- Rosenthal/Róžant, 265 inh.
- Schmerlitz/Smjerdźaca, 182 inh.
- Schönau/Šunow, 308 inh.
- Zerna/Sernjany, 191 inh.

In 2001, 84.3 per cent of the population spoke Upper Sorbian.
