= Panschwitz-Kuckau =

Panschwitz-Kuckau/Pančicy-Kukow
- Municipality
- Location of Panschwitz-Kuckau/Pančicy-Kukow within Bautzen district
- Interactive map of Panschwitz-Kuckau/Pančicy-Kukow
- Location within Germany Location within Saxony
- Coordinates: 51°14′N 14°12′E
- Country: Germany
- State: Saxony
- District: Bautzen
- Municipal assoc.: Am Klosterwasser
- Subdivisions: 13

Government
  - Mayor (2021–28): Markuz Kreuz (CDU)

Area
  - Total: 23.37 km^{2} (9.02 sq mi)
- Elevation: 190 m (620 ft)

Population (2025-12-31)
  - Total: 2,017
  - Density: 86.31/km^{2} (223.5/sq mi)
- Time zone: UTC+01:00 (CET)
  - Summer (DST): UTC+02:00 (CEST)
- Postal codes: 01920
- Dialling codes: 035796
- Vehicle registration: BZ, BIW, HY, KM
- Website: www.panschwitz-kuckau.de

Panschwitz-Kuckau (German) or Pančicy-Kukow (Upper Sorbian, pronounced [ˈpantʃitsɨ ˈkukɔf]) is a municipality in the district of Bautzen, in Saxony, Germany. It is the site of the well-known monastery Sankt Marienstern.

The place is located at both sides of the Klosterwasser stream.

The municipality is part of the recognized Sorbian settlement area in Saxony. Upper Sorbian has an official status next to German, all villages bear names in both languages. In 2001, half of the population spoke Sorbian.

Due to the local Sorbian dominance the population is mainly Catholic.

== St Marienstern Monastery ==
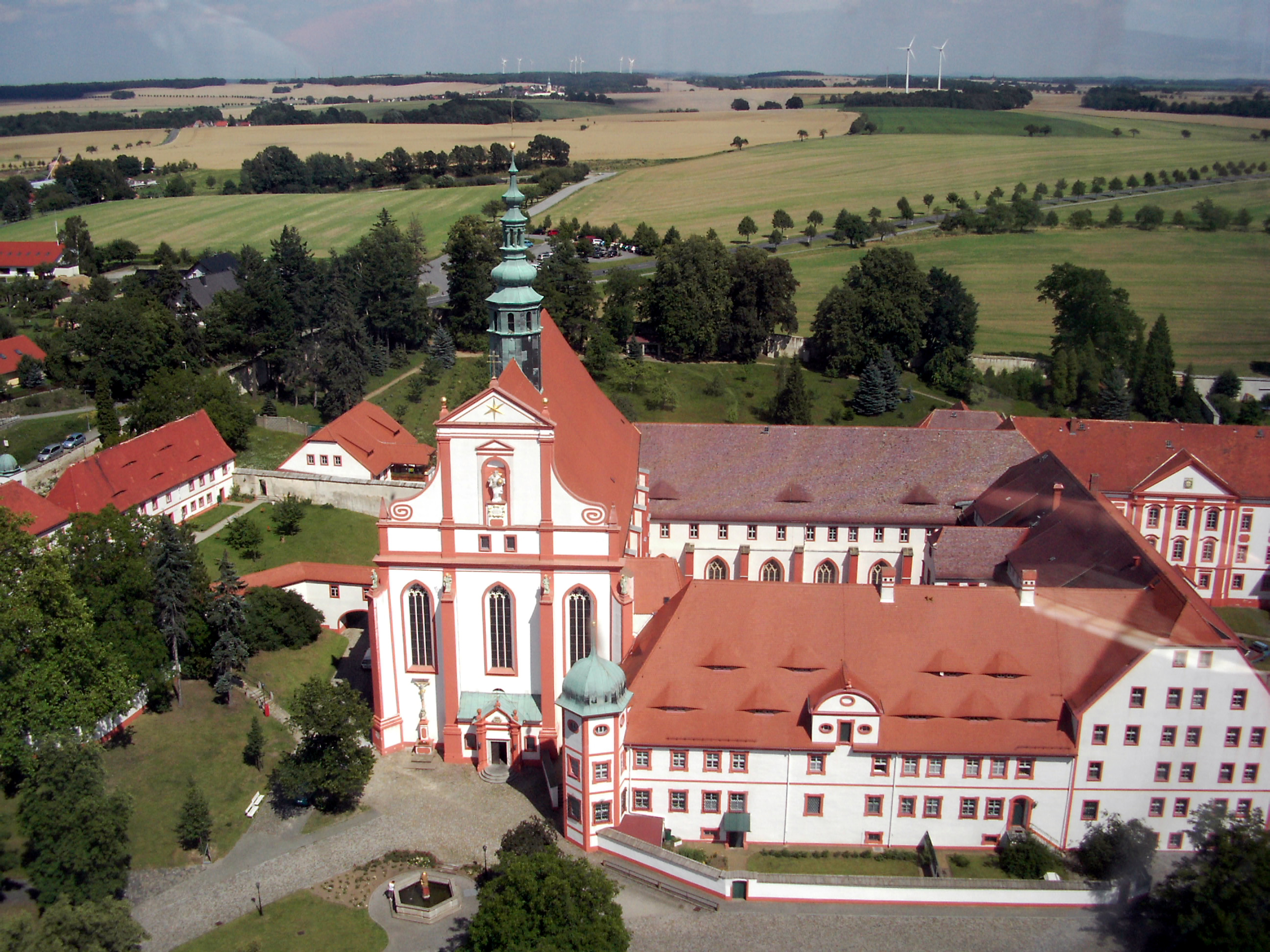
St. Marienstern from above

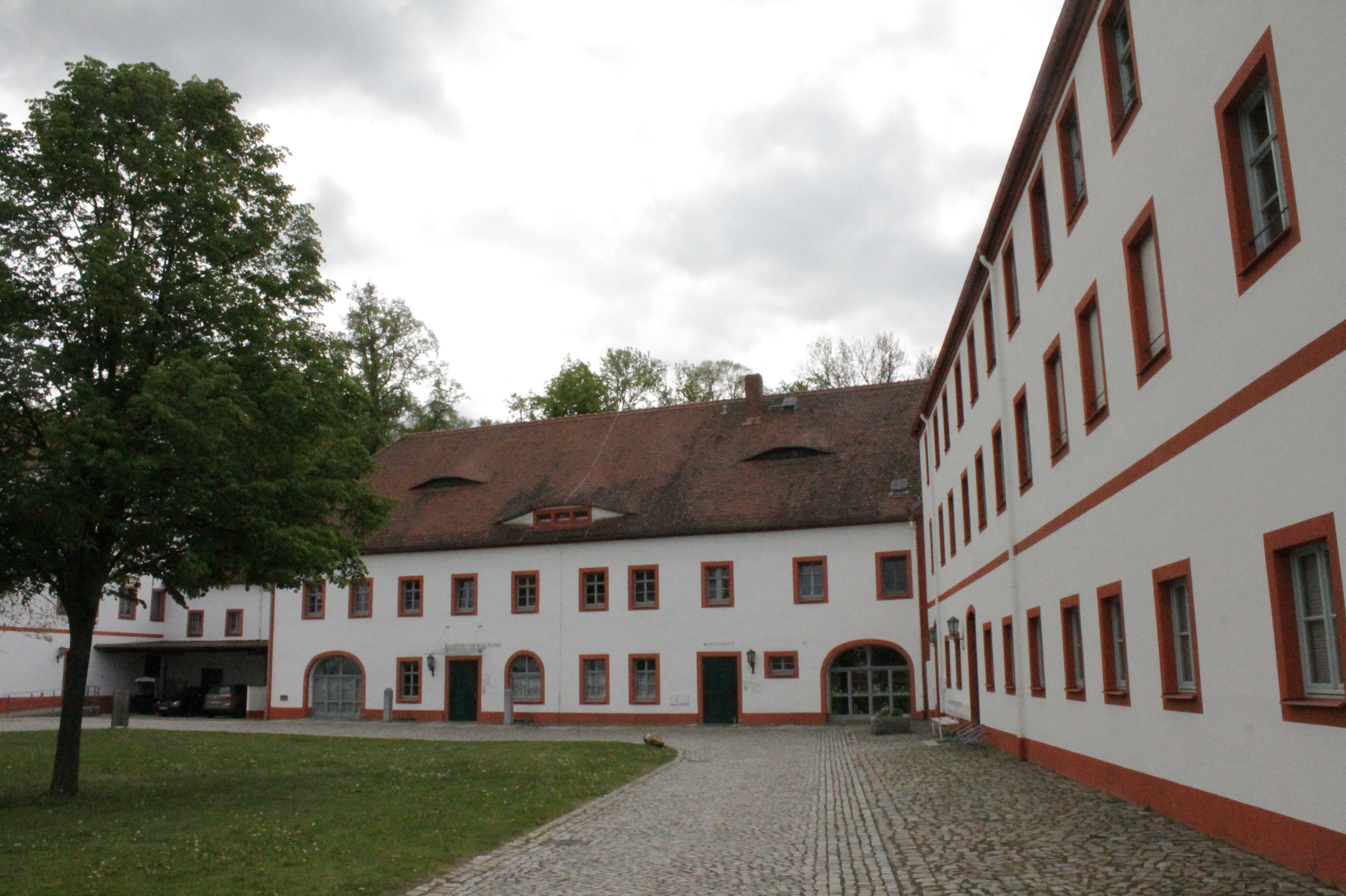
Central courtyard, St Marienstern, Panschwitz-Kuckau

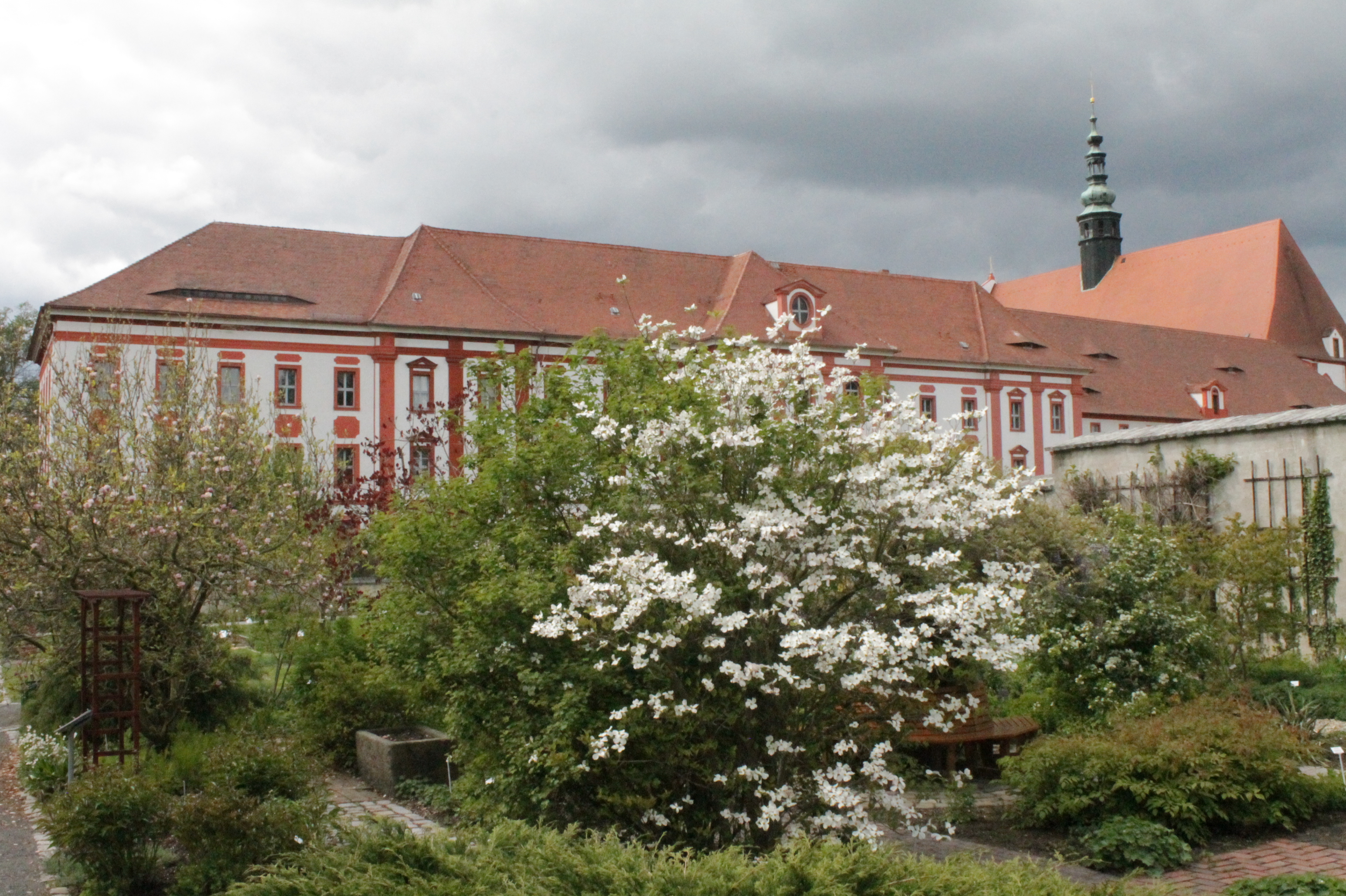
St Marienstern from the herb garden, Panschwitz-Kuckau

The village is dominated by the huge monastery of St Marienstern.

It was founded as a Cistercian monastery in 1248. The current structures mainly date from the 17th and 18th century.

The complex contains a Klosterstube (monastery restaurant, currently closed), a bakery, and a small botanical/herb garden to the south-east open at a small charge.

The small river Klosterwasser runs through the monastery and would have served its water and brewing needs.
