= Breiter Graben =

Breiter Graben Flutgraben
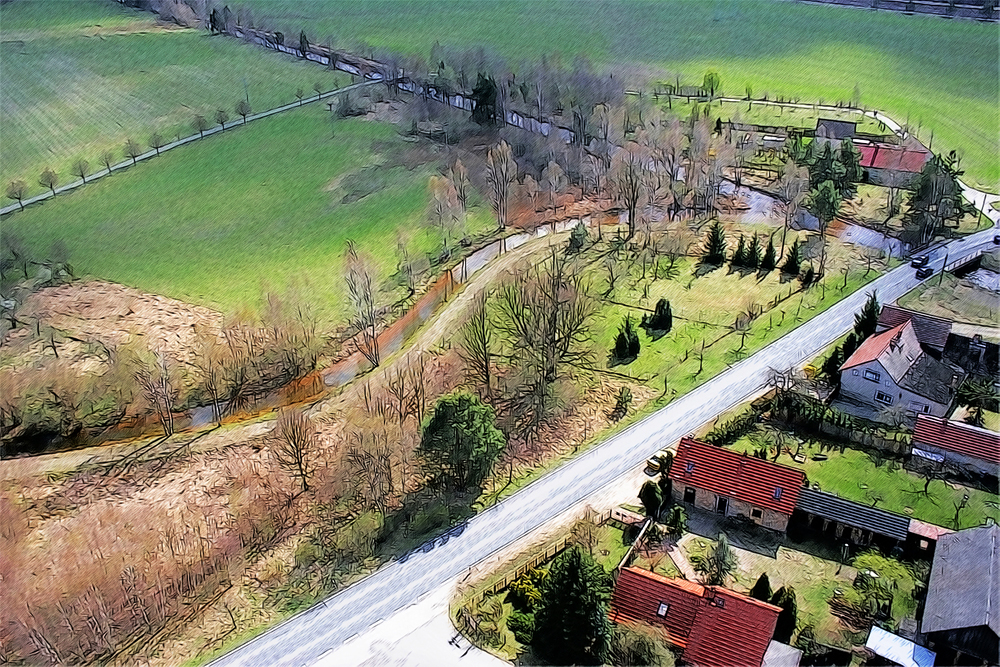
- Breiter Graben (top left) joining Struga near Mulkwitz

Location
- Country: Germany

Physical characteristics
- Source
  - location: Nochtener Weg, Mühlrose
  - coordinates: 51°29′04″N 14°31′38″E
- Mouth
  - location: east of bridge of state road 130, Mulkwitz
  - coordinates: 51°30′34″N 14°29′30″E
- Length: 4.4 km (2.7 mi)

Basin features
- Progression: Struga – Spree – Havel – Elbe – North Sea

Breiter Graben (Upper Sorbian: Šěroka hrjebja) is a canal in Landkreis Görlitz, Saxony, Germany. It is also known as Flutgraben (Přiliwowa hrjebja) and runs between the north-western edge of the lignite open-cast mine Nochten and the village of Mulkwitz where it joins the river Struga, a tributary of the river Spree. On its course, it passes north of the village Mühlrose. Its acidic, iron-rich water, originating from an open-cast mine, heavily pollutes Struga river.
