= Struga (river) =

River in Germany

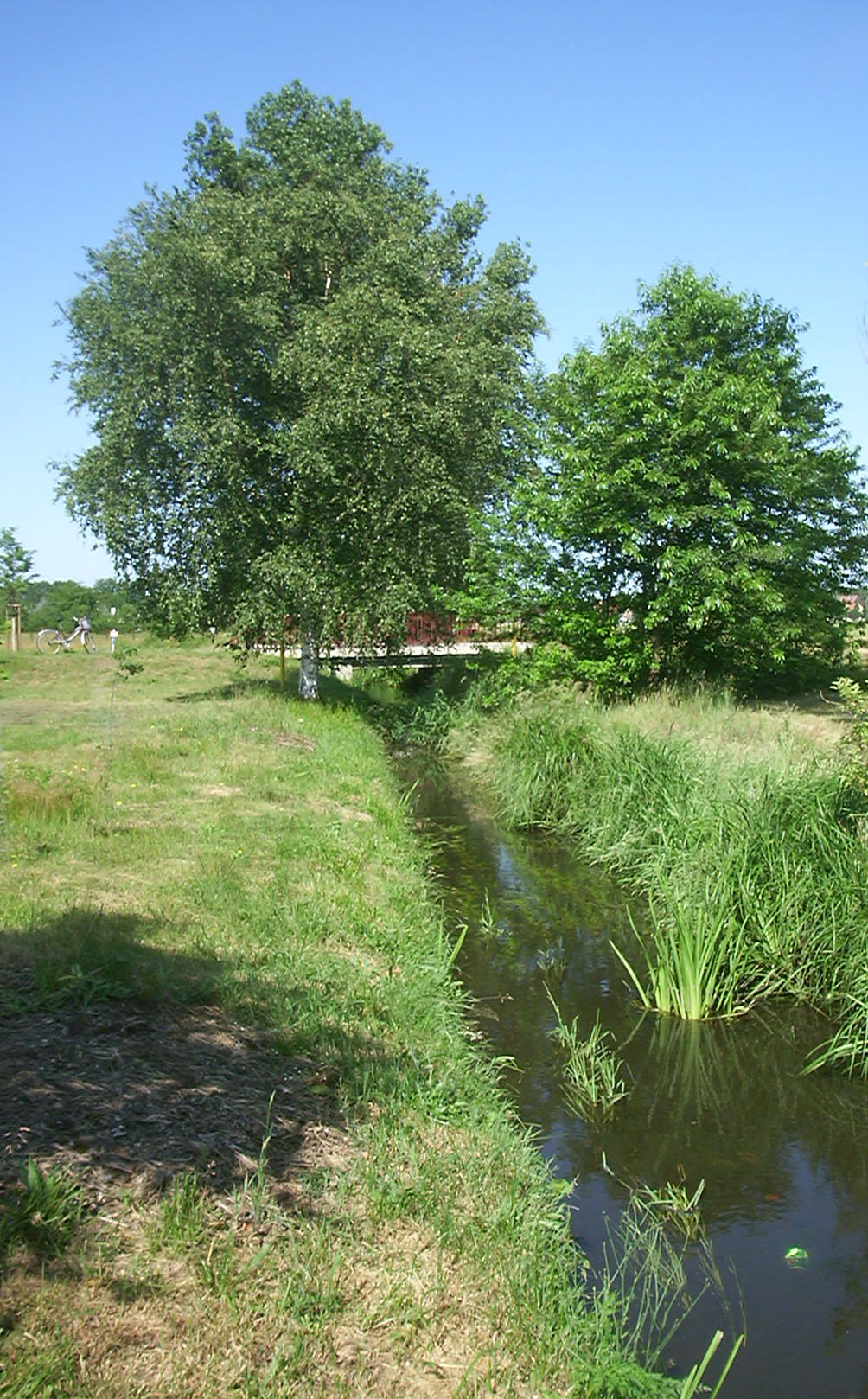
- Struga near Schleife, looking west

Location
- Country: Germany
- State: Saxony

Physical characteristics
- Source
  - location: Weißwasser
- Mouth
  - location: Spree north of Neustadt, Spreetal
  - coordinates: 51°29′34″N 14°26′23″E

Basin features
- Progression: Spree→ Havel→ Elbe→ North Sea

Struga is a river of Saxony, Germany in northern Upper Lusatia. It is a right tributary of the Spree, which it joins in Neustadt (Spree). It passes through the lignite mining region north of the Nochten opencast mine and is canalized for its whole length. Its basin is marked by past and present mining activities.

The river is a principal landmark of the Schleife region, although it is locally considered only a stream.

== Etymology ==
The name of the river is derived either from the Upper Sorbian word pstruha for the once common brown trout (the dialect of Schleife changes the Upper Sorabian 'h' to the Lower Sorbian 'g'), or from struga (Polish for "stream"). Also, struža means "small brook". According to the linguist Paul Kühnel, struga is considered to mean "flood, surge" in Old Slavic, or "water body, river arm" in newer Slavic languages. He gives the historic Sorbian name as Struha.

== River course ==
The river originates from a source west of Weißwasser and runs initially in a north-western direction towards Trebendorf, then for some kilometres along the Berlin–Görlitz railway, before it turns towards Schleife where it passes the nature reserve around the medieval fishponds (Altes Schleifer Teichgelände). It separates the historic centre of Schleife from the newer housing estates which were built in the first half of the 20th century. A secondary arm of the river runs from Trebendorf towards Halbendorfer See and is used to regulate the water level of this lake.

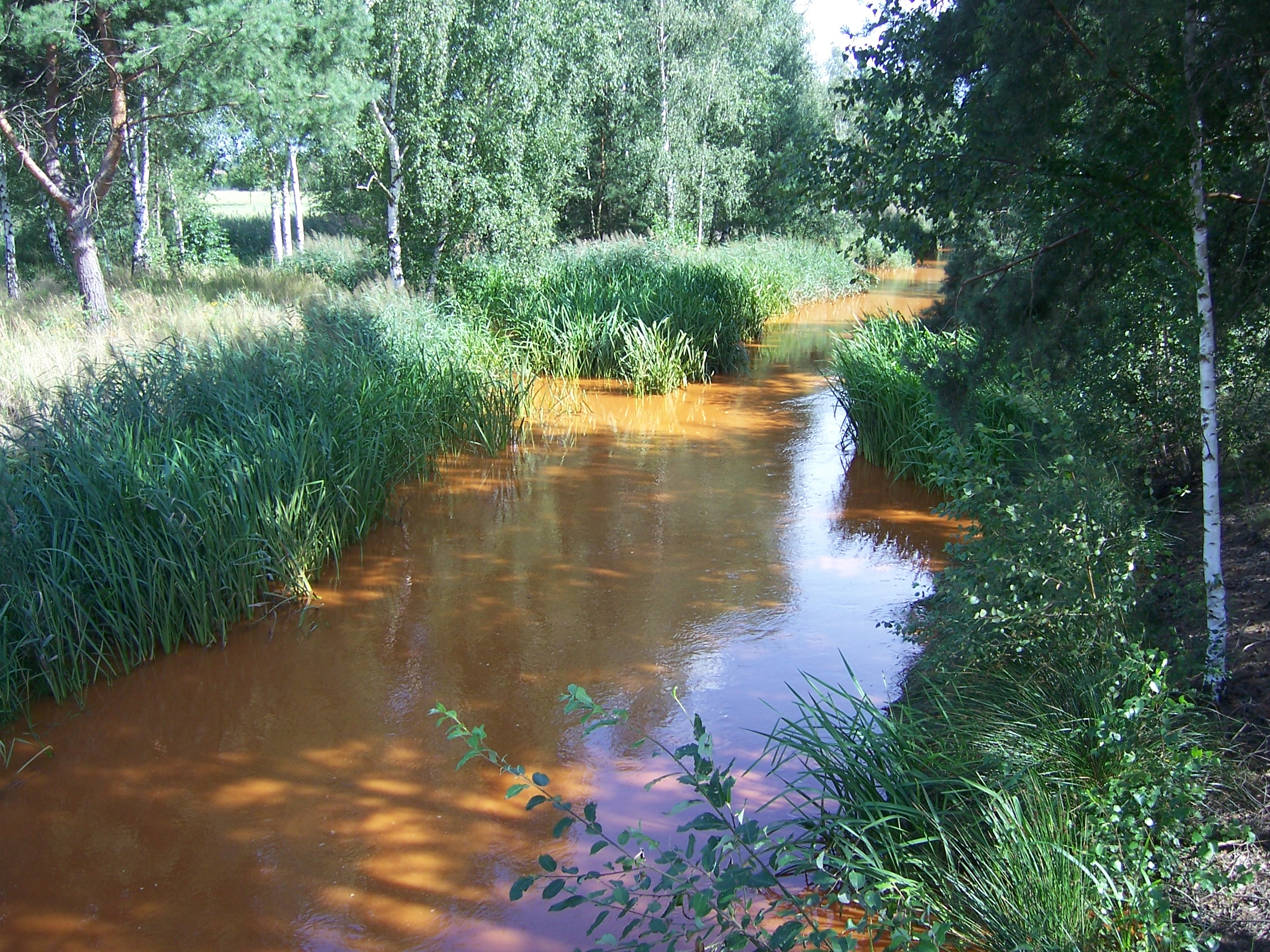
Breiter Graben joining Struga near Mulkwitz (2008)

Further on, Struga river passes north of the centre of the village Rohne along the historic boundaries of the farmsteads. South of neighbouring Mulkwitz it is joined by Breiter Graben which carries water pumped from Nochten opencast mine, and which at the junction carries more water than Struga. From there on, Struga is considered a river proper, and not a stream any more. It then continues towards Neustadt in Landkreis Bautzen, where most of its water is led into basins, while the remainder flows north of Neustadt village into the river Spree. The water from the basins is mostly led towards Vattenfall's mine water purification plant in Schwarze Pumpe.

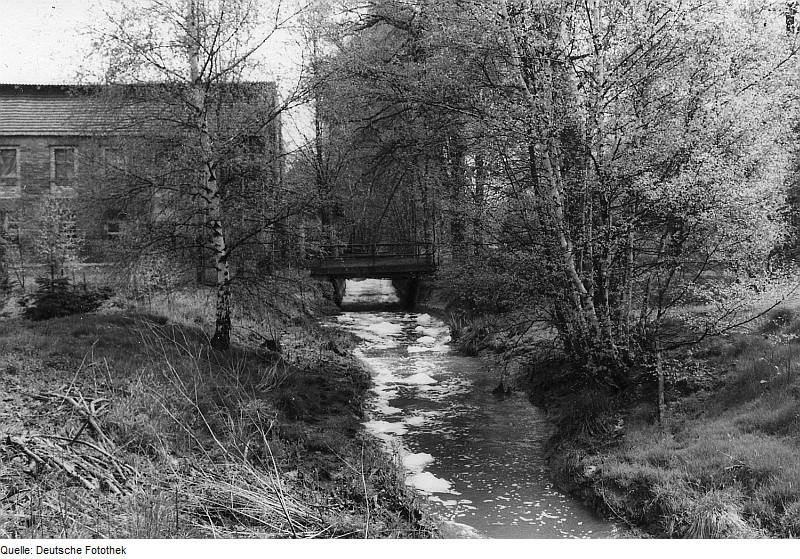
Struga near the old spinning mill of Neustadt (1987)

== Ecology ==
Due to the river passing through a mining region, its water is acidic and rich in iron. Especially before the political and economic changes in the GDR, industrial waste waters, in particular from the Weißwasser glassworks, caused heavy pollution. In 2003, pH values of 3.4 and 6.4 were measured in Schleife. After the inflow of mine waters from Breiter Graben into Struga, the river is considered to be ecologically ruined.

== See also ==
- List of rivers of Saxony
