= Serbski dom =

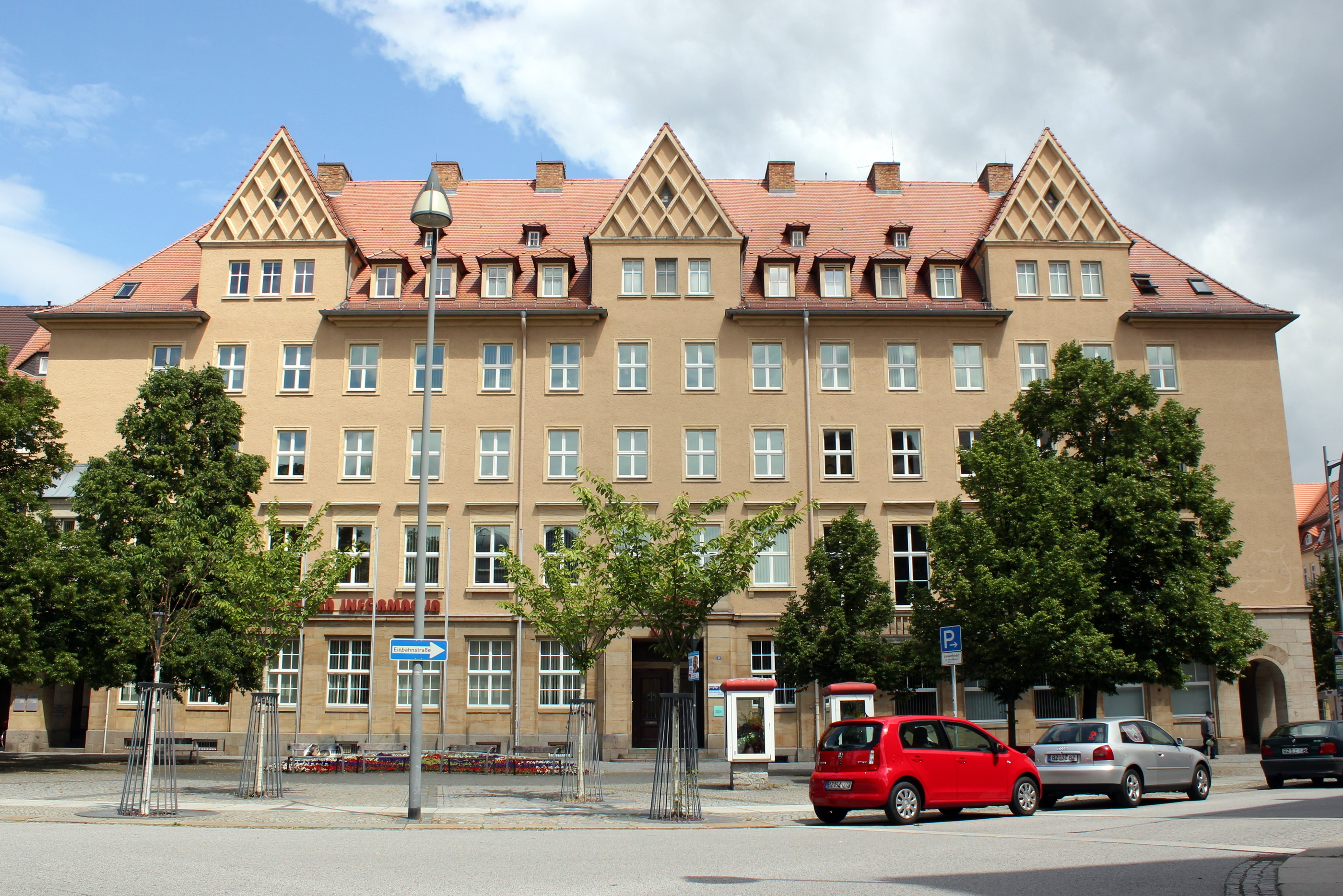
- Alternative names: Haus der Sorben

General information
- Location: Postplatz 2, Bautzen/Budyšin, Germany
- Coordinates: 51°10′41″N 14°25′44″E
- Groundbreaking: 24 August 1947
- Inaugurated: 8 July 1956

Design and construction
- Architect: Friedrich Rötschke

The Serbski dom (German: Haus der Sorben, 'House of the Sorbs') is an administrative building on Postplatz 2 in Bautzen, Saxony, Germany. It is the cultural and political center of the Sorbian people. It was built between 1947 and 1956. It is the seat of Domowina and the Foundation for the Sorbian People.

The new building was necessary since the original Serbski dom (German: Wendisches Haus) was destroyed in April 1945. While bearing the same Sorbian name in order to convey continuity, the German name switched due to the pejorative use of the term Wenden during the Nazi period.

== History ==
=== Wendisches Haus (1845–1945) ===
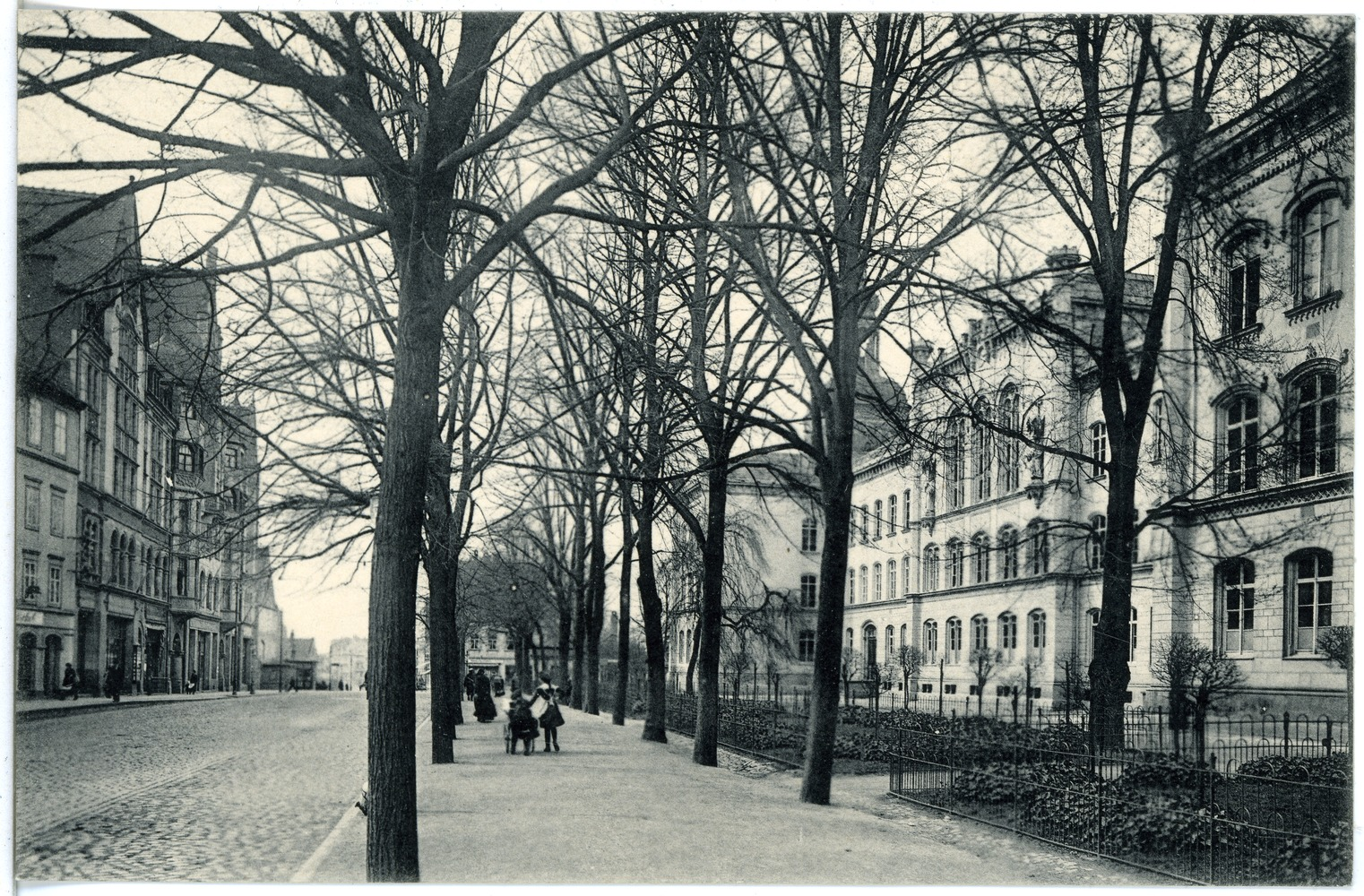
Wendisches Haus (left) on the Lauengraben, 1915

The idea of creating a house for the Sorbian culture dates back to 1845 based on which the Maćica Serbska, a scientific and cultural association, was founded in 1847. Pressured by Jan Arnošt Smoler, the then head of Maćica Serbska, the association began to collect donations for the construction of the Serbski dom (Wendisches Haus) in 1866. At his own risk, Smoler acquired a building at Lauengraben, Bautzen, which was to become the center of Maćica Serbska. Since most Sorbs were rather poor, Smoler turned to other Slavic nations, especially Russia in search of donors. His last voyage to Russia was in 1883, one year before his death.

Due to the amount of books stored in its library and the ever-growing collection of ethnological objects, the house proved to be to small for its purpose. Arnošt Muka initiated the construction of a new Serbski dom on the ground acquired by Smoler. He organized the funding and commissioned the architect August Grothe from Dresden, who proposed a renaissance style house. The groundbreaking was April 21, 1897, on the occasion of the 50th Jubilee of the Maćica Serbska.

Jurij Łusčanski, the apostolic prefect of Meißen in Upper Lusatia and head of the Maćica Serbska inaugurated the building on September 26, 1904, after seven years of construction. A hall was built in 1907. It became the center of Sorbian cultural life, accommodating the scientific community and its library, the Wendische Museum and the Smoler'sche Druckerei und Buchhandlung (Smoler's publishing and book store). In 1912, the newly created Domowina moved in. The Sorbian Bank (Wendische Volksbank, Serbska ludowa banka) was founded in the Serbski dom in 1919.

Following Hitler's rise to power, the Sorbs were supposed to integrate into the new structures. As the Domowina resisted, it was banned and disbanded. Hereafter, all the other Sorbian organizations and media were banned and the public use of Sorbian restricted. The building was confiscated. The café was renamed "Schöne Lausitz" ("Beautiful Lusatia"), the publishing house was shut down. The hall was used as a NSDAP reunion room. The collection was destroyed, sold or brought to the Ortenburg. During the last days of the war, the SS set fire to the building. Furthermore, it was hit by a bomb.

=== After World War II ===
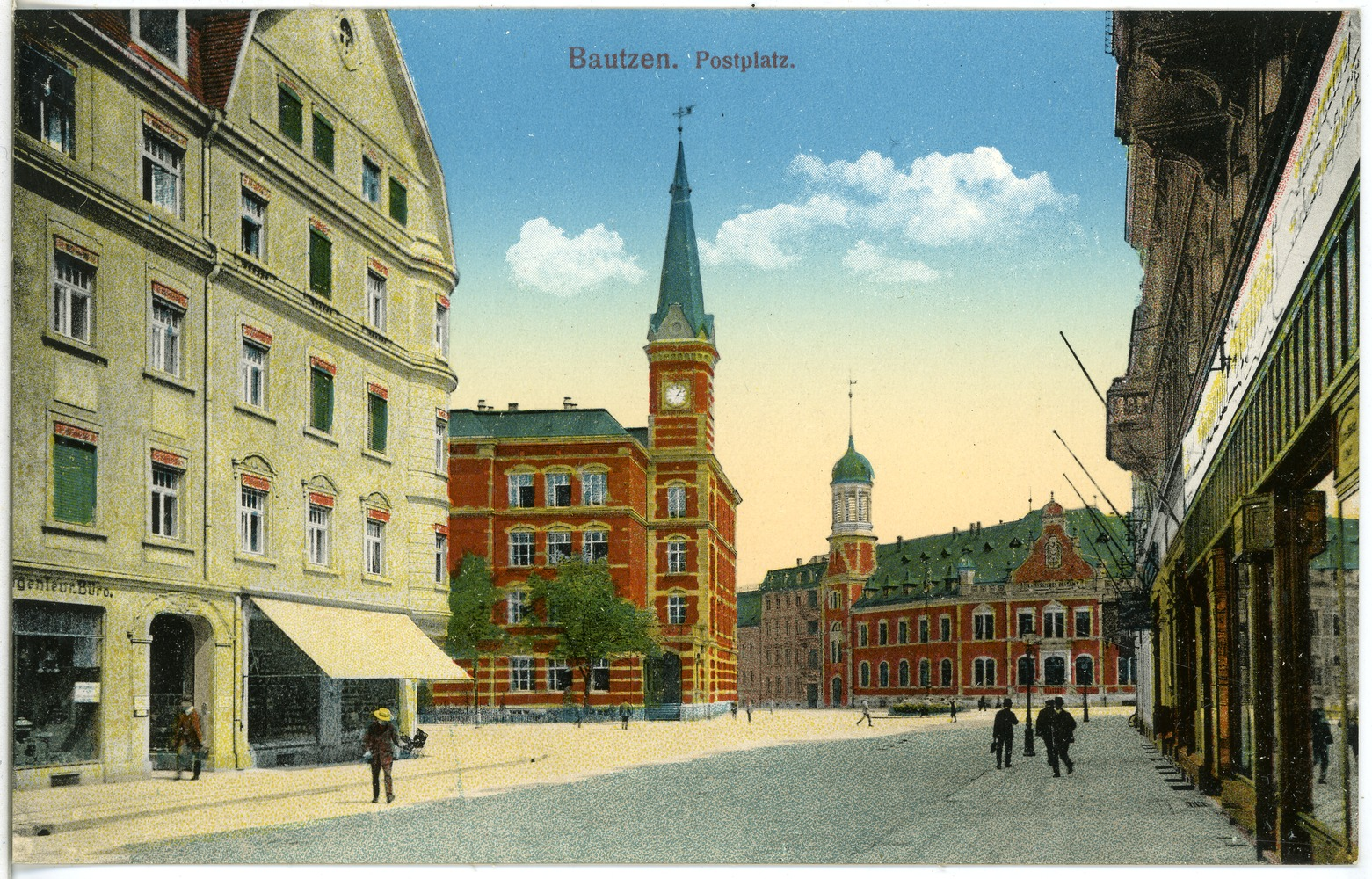
View along Goschwitz street to Postplatz with the Lessing School (left) and the Post Office (right), 1914

After World War II, the Sorbs were again allowed to speak their language and practice their culture. The Bautzen municipal council passed a bylaw on March 6, 1947, transferring the property of the burnt-down Lessing School to the Maćica Serbska as a replacement for the Wendisches Haus. Following a call to tender, the architectural practice Högg & Rötschke from Dresden was chosen to build the Serbski dom. On August 24, 1947, the groundbreaking coincided with the 100th jubilee of the Maćica Serbska. It was attended by numerous guests, including representatives of Slavic speaking countries.

The building was funded by donations from the Lusatia and Slavic speaking countries (especially the ČSSR, Poland and Yugoslavia) yielding 1.5 million RM. In addition, young people of the surrounding villages worked for free in the brigades of the Sorbian youth organization Serbska młodźina during the Natwarjamy Serbski dom ('We build the house of the Sorbs') campaign. The political climate in the Soviet-occupied zone, Maćica Serbska became a part of Domowina. During the currency reform in 1948, changing Reichsmark (RM) 10:1 for East German Mark (DM), the Domowina lost most of its funds. The construction was severely impaired by the lack of financial resources. Therefore, the government allocated 500.000 DM to the construction of Serbski dom. Shortly before it was finished, Domowina transferred the building to become public property. The building was inaugurated on July 8, 1956, on occasion of the 2nd Sorbian Peoples Congress.

In 1954, the city of Bautzen renamed the street in between August-Bebel Plaza and the Postplatz to Dr.-Ernst-Mucke street, commemorating the 100th birthday of Arnošt Muka (1854–1932).

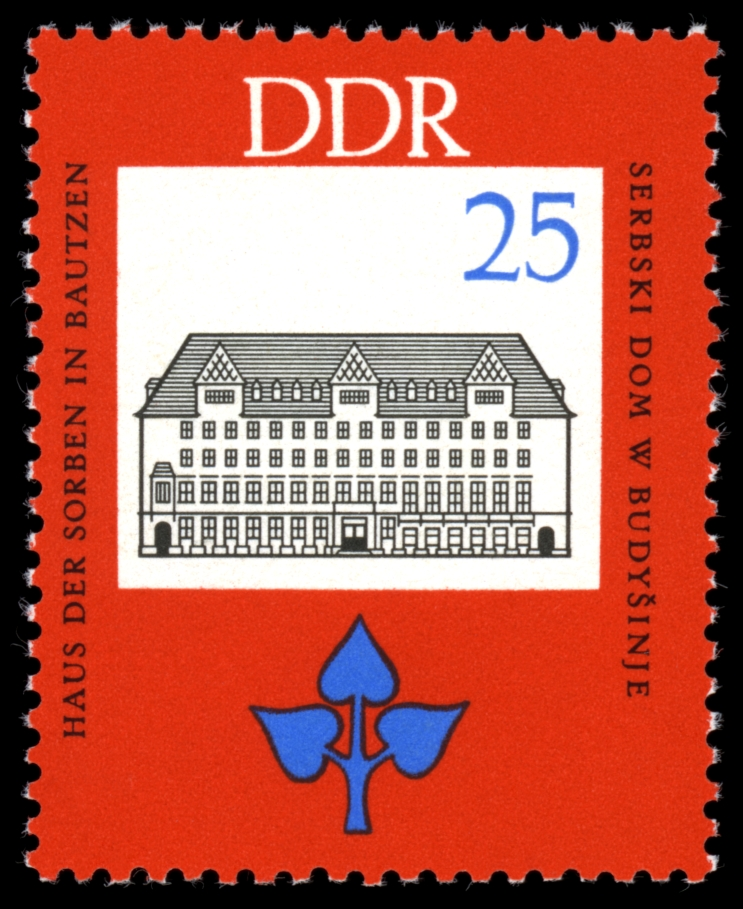
Deutsche Post of the GDR stamp, 1966

Kurt Heine created a long term documentation of the history of the Serbski dom from 1947 to 1959 called Naš serbski dom. The 70 minutes film shows the cleanup efforts after the war, the groundbreaking and the use of the finished building. In 2017, the film was digitized.

To commemorate the 150th birthday of Jan Arnošt Smoler, Johannes Hansky and Gerhard Stauf designed two stamps for the Deutsche Post of the GDR, issued March 1, 1966, depicting Smoler (20 Pf.) and the Serbski dom (25 Pf.).

In 2012/2013, the interior was renovated and the rooms of the former café became office rooms.

== Description ==
It is a cultural heritage monument in center of Bautzen. It is a four-story sand stone building with triangular gables. The facade of the ground level is visible stone, while the upper floors are uniform. The building is situated on the northern side of Postplatz, in between Karl-Marx street to the west and Kurt-Pchalek street to the east.

The facade on the Kurt-Pchalek street resembles the sand stone sculpture "Jungbrigadierleiter", commemorating the Brigaden movement during the construction phase.

== Tenants ==
Domowina, Serbski Sokoł, and the Foundation for the Sorbian People use the Serbski dom as their main office . Additionally, it accommodates the Sorbian Culture Information and the Sorabia-Film-Studios.

From 1991 to 2020, Studio Bautzen, a part of the Sorbian Broadcasting of MDR, used the attic floor. Then, they moved to the Post building directly opposite at Postplatz 3. Before, Sender Cottbus broadcast from those rooms since 1963.

Until February 2010, the ground level had a café, called »Bjesada«.
