= Maćica Serbska =

Scientific association for Sorbian studies

Maćica Serbska (Upper Sorbian name, pronounced [ˈmatʃitsa ˈsɛʁpska]; Lower Sorbian: Maśica Serbska [ˈmaɕitsa ˈsɛrpska]) is a scientific association of Sorbs. It aims at promoting Sorbian studies and disseminating knowledge about the Sorbs and their culture. It is the oldest Sorbian association that is still operational. Its chair person is Anja Pohontsch since 2020.

== History ==
In 1847, the Maćica Serbska was founded in Bautzen by Handrij Zejler, Jan Arnošt Smoler, Korla Jan Smoler, Křesćan Bohuwěr Pful, and others as a Sorbian publishing house. By and by, it became the center of Sorbian culture and research in Sorbian studies. The association issued its own magazine Časopis Maćicy Serbskeje (ČMS) from 1848 to 1937. In 1848, during the German revolutions, the Maćica unsuccessfully petitioned the Saxon Court to emancipate the Sorbian language in education and local administration.

In the second half of the 19th century, the Maćica played a crucial role in creating a uniform Upper Sorbian written language.

A Lower Sorbian department, the Maśica Serbska, was founded in Cottbus in 1880 at the instance of Hendrich Jordan and Kito Šwjela.

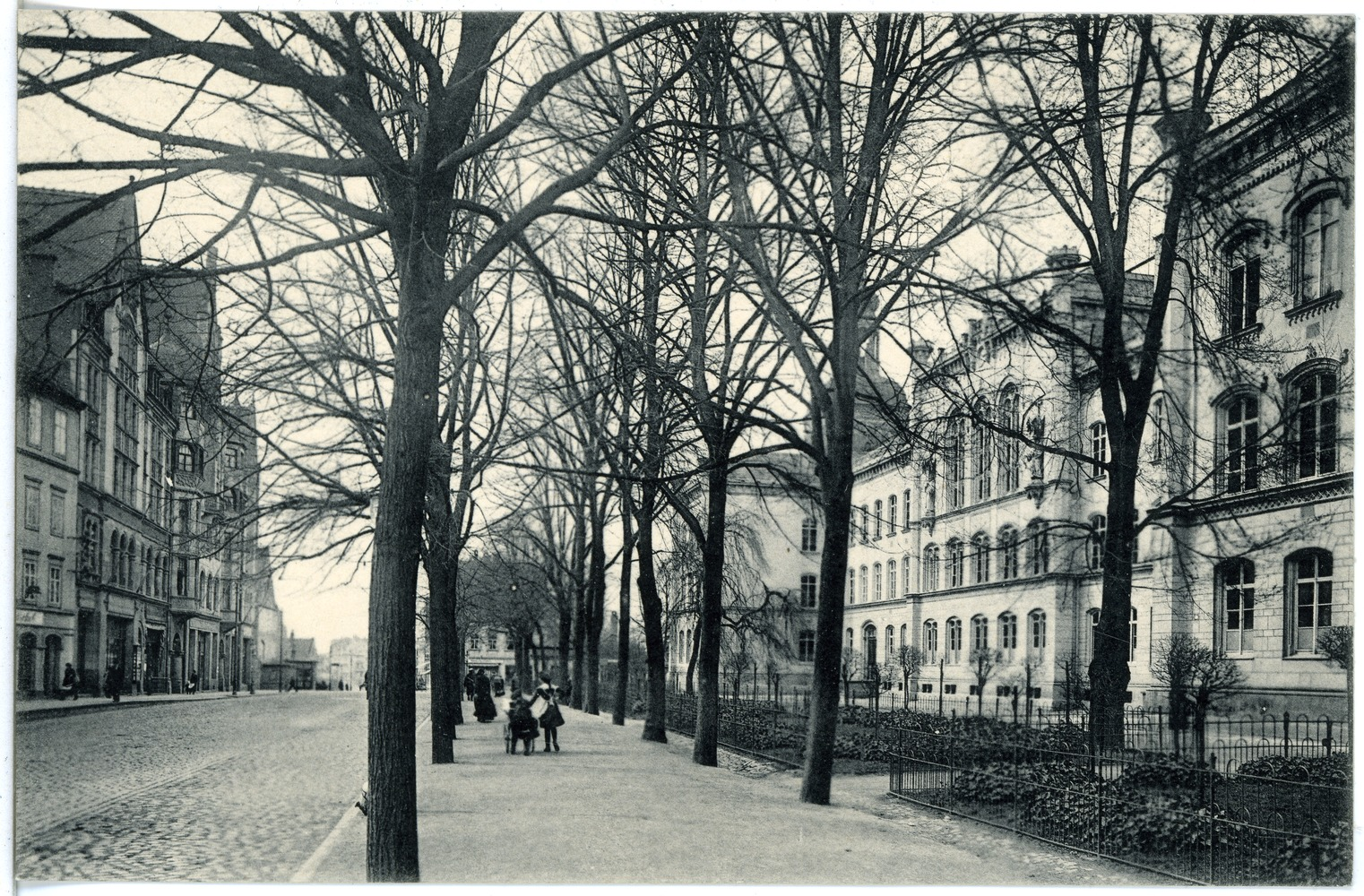
Serbski dom/Wendisches Haus (left) on the Lauengraben, 1915

In Bautzen, the Maćica built the Serbski dom (inaugurated in 1904), which was financed by means of donations. The Serbski dom served as a Sorbian museum, archive, library and event venue for the Maćica and other Sorbian associations.

The Lower Sorbian Maśica Serbska organized the Spreewälder Volks- und Trachtenfeste in Vetschau from 1929 to 1932.

The Nazi government prohibited all public activities of Sorbian associations in 1937. In 1941, the Maćica's assets were seized and the association disbanded. The Serbski dom was destroyed in 1945.

Immediately after the war, the Maćica resumed its activity. On demand of the Soviet administration, it had to give up its independence, becoming a part of Domowina in 1949. In 1951, the coordination of research in Sorbian studies traditionally done by the Maćica was handed over to the newly founded Serbski institut, a part of the German Academy of Sciences at Berlin.

Following the Peaceful Revolution, the Maćica Serbska was reestablished in 1991 and became a member of the Sorbian umbrella organization Domowina in 1992. In 1993, the Maśica Serbska was reestablished, too.

== Activities ==
The Maćica organizes conferences on Sorbian history and culture, e.g. its annual main conference in Bautzen, and internationally, it co-organizes conferences on Slavic studies. It also organizes speeches and other events in the Sorbian settlement area. The association helps maintaining Sorbian monuments and promotes the creation of new monuments.

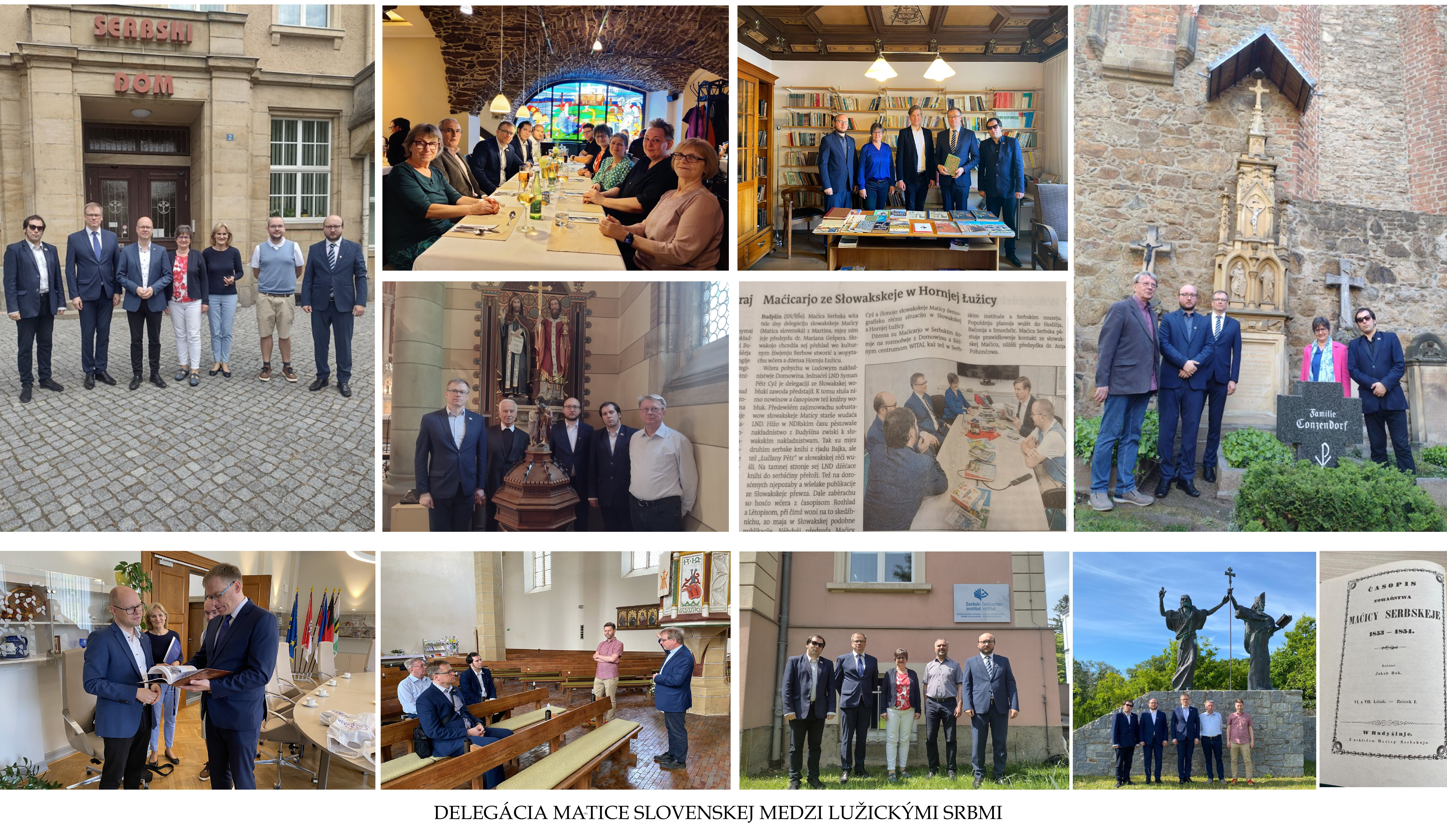
Delegation of Slovak Matica on an official cultural visit to Lusatian-Serbian Matica (Die Maćica Serbska), Domowina, Sorbian Institute and Serbski Dom

The Maćica Serbska entertains close relations with its sister associations Matice slezská, Matice moravská, Matica slovenská, and Matica srpska. In 2025, a delegation from the Slovak Matica visited the institution of the Lusatian Serbs at the invitation of The Maćica Serbska.

== Members ==
As of 2014, it has 117 registered members, most of which live in Lusatia, but also in other regions of Germany, in Russia, Poland, Czechia, Slovakia, England, Finland or the Netherlands.

Its best known members were:

- Ludvík Kuba, Czeck painter
- William Krause, German artist
- Pětr Młónk, Sorbian poet
- Mjertyn Moń, Lower Sorbian teacher and linguist
- Arnošt Muka, Sorbian linguist and ethnologist
- Jan Arnošt Smoler, Sorbian linguist, writer and editor
- Bogumił Šwjela, Lutheran pastor and linguist
- Georg Wuschanski, Catholic bishop and bible translator
- Handrij Zejler, Luthern pastor and writer

== See also ==
- Matice česká, Czech equivalent
- Matica slovenská, Slovak equivalent
- Slovenska matica, Slovenian equivalent
- Matica hrvatska, Croatian equivalent
- Matica srpska, Serbian equivalent
