= Domowina =

Non-profit political organization

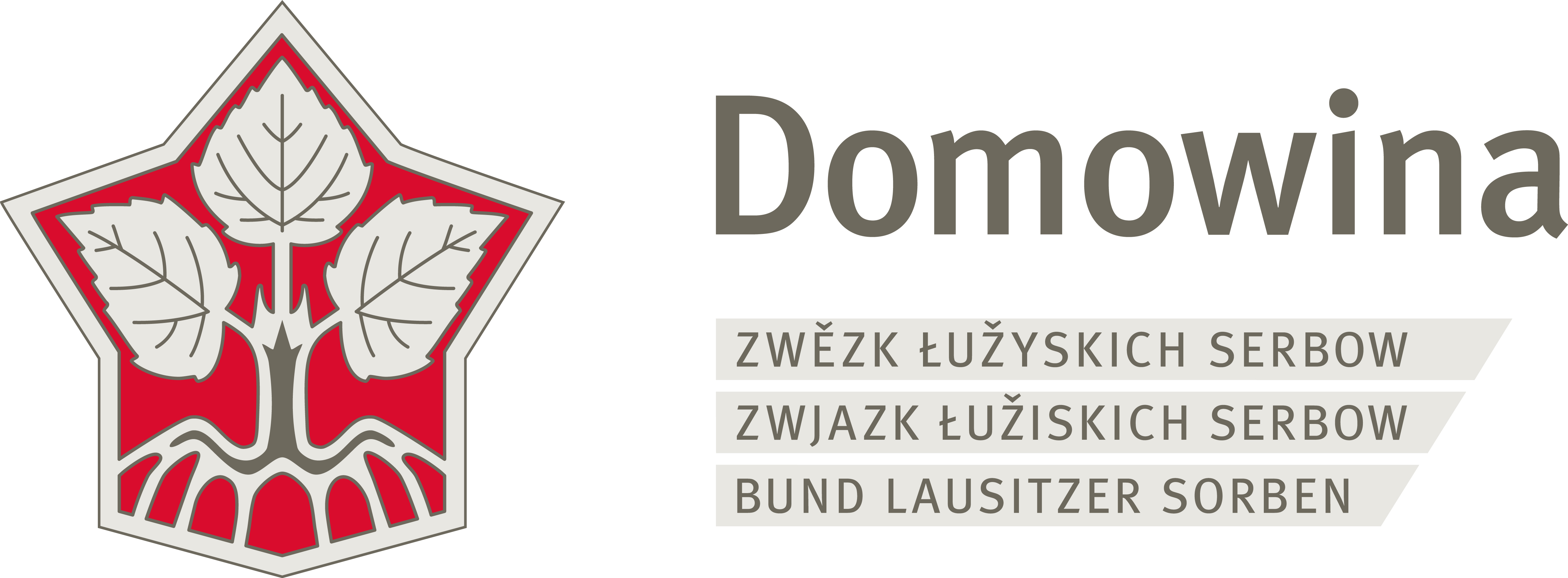
- Founded: 1912
- Type: Non-profit, NGO
- Location: Bautzen
- Website: Official website

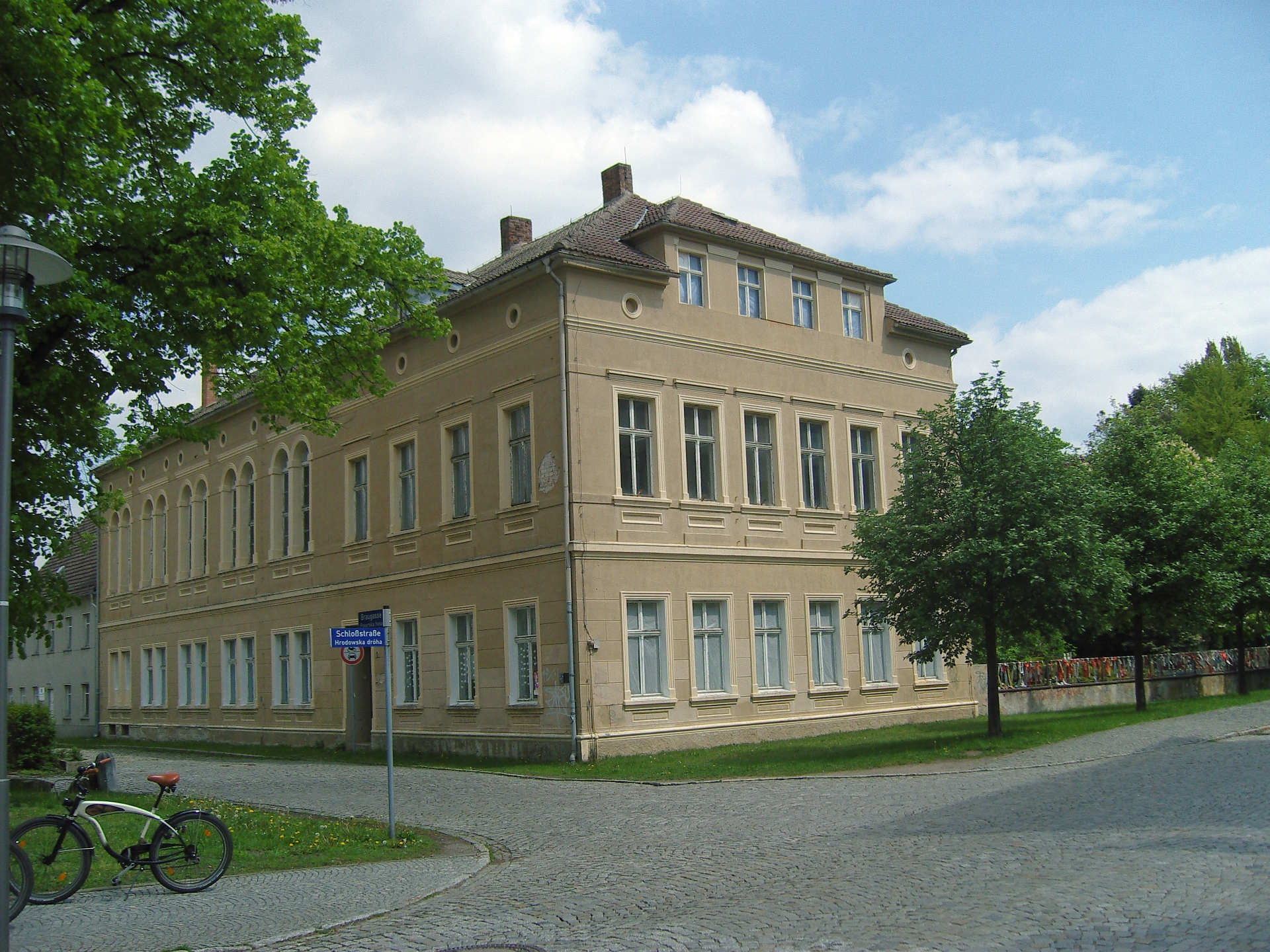
Former ballroom and community center in Hoyerswerda, foundation of the Domowina

Domowina (lit. 'Homeland') is a political independent league of the Sorbian and Wendish people and umbrella organization of Sorbian societies in Lower and Upper Lusatia, Germany. It represents the interests of Sorbian people and is the continual successor of the previous Domowina League of the Lusatian Sorbs (German: Domowina Bund Lausitzer Sorben, Upper Sorbian: Zwjazk Łužiskich Serbow, Lower Sorbian: Zwězk Łužyskich Serbow). The organization has been a member of the Federal Union of European Nationalities since 1990.

== Name ==
The Sorbian word Domowina is a poetic expression for 'homeland'. The name was proposed by Domowina co-founder Bogumił Šwjela, then Lutheran pastor of Nochten and Sorbian linguist.

== History ==
The Domowina institution, founded in Hoyerswerda in 1912, is situated in Bautzen (Budyšin) in Saxony alongside other cultural institutions of the Sorbian people for which it serves as an umbrella organization.

The Domowina was closed by Nazi authorities in 1937 and reopened on 10 May 1945, right after the end of World War II, and regained official status in the German Democratic Republic.

Under East German rule, Domowina was a mass organization included in the National Front, and was effectively controlled by the SED. Though the government did recognize Sorbs as a linguistic community within the GDR, they were not recognized as a minority, which ran contrary to the demands of the league. Upon the fall of communism in East Germany and German reunification, Domowina was reformed yet again on 17 March 1990, this time as an independent organization.

== Regional associations ==
In Sorbian, the regional associations are called župa.

- Domowina Regional Association "Jan Arnošt Smoler" Bautzen:

founded July 24, 1921 in Bautzen

- Domowina Regional Association "Michał Hórnik" Kamenz:

founded July 24, 1921 in Crostwitz

- Domowina Regional Association "Handrij Zejler" Hoyerswerda:

founded July 24, 1921 in Hoyerswerda

- Domowina Regional Association Lower Lusatia in Cottbus:

founded May 31, 1991 in Cottbus by fusing the former regional associations of Cottbus (since 1949/50), Guben/Forst (1954), Calau/Lübben (1955) and Spremberg (1956)

- Domowina Regional Association "Jakub Lorenc-Zalěski" in Schleife:

founded October 28, 2013 as a successor of the Regional Association Weißwasser and Niesky which in turn was created in 1991 by fusing the two regional associations of Niesky and Weißwasser. Those were once one regional association (Niesky, founded 1945), but separated for political reasons in 1957 to match the administrative division of the GDR.

== Members ==
The following associations are members of the Domowina:

- the regional associations of Domowina (Sorbian: župa)
- the Sorbian School Association
- the Union of Sorbian Students
- the Serbski Sokoł (Sorbian Sports Association)
- the Sorbian Cultural Tourism Association
- the Maćica Serbska (Sorbian Scientific Association)
- the Union of Sorbian Choirs
- the Sorbian Artists Association
- the Society of Saints Cyril and Methodius (Association of Catholic Sorbs)
- Pawk (Sorbian Youth Association)
- the Sorbian Union of Trade
- the Sorbian Cultural Sponsoring Society
- the Society for the Promotion of Sorbian Culture and Informal Center in Berlin
- the Bildungsgut Schmochtitz Sankt Benno (as a sponsoring member)

== Seat ==
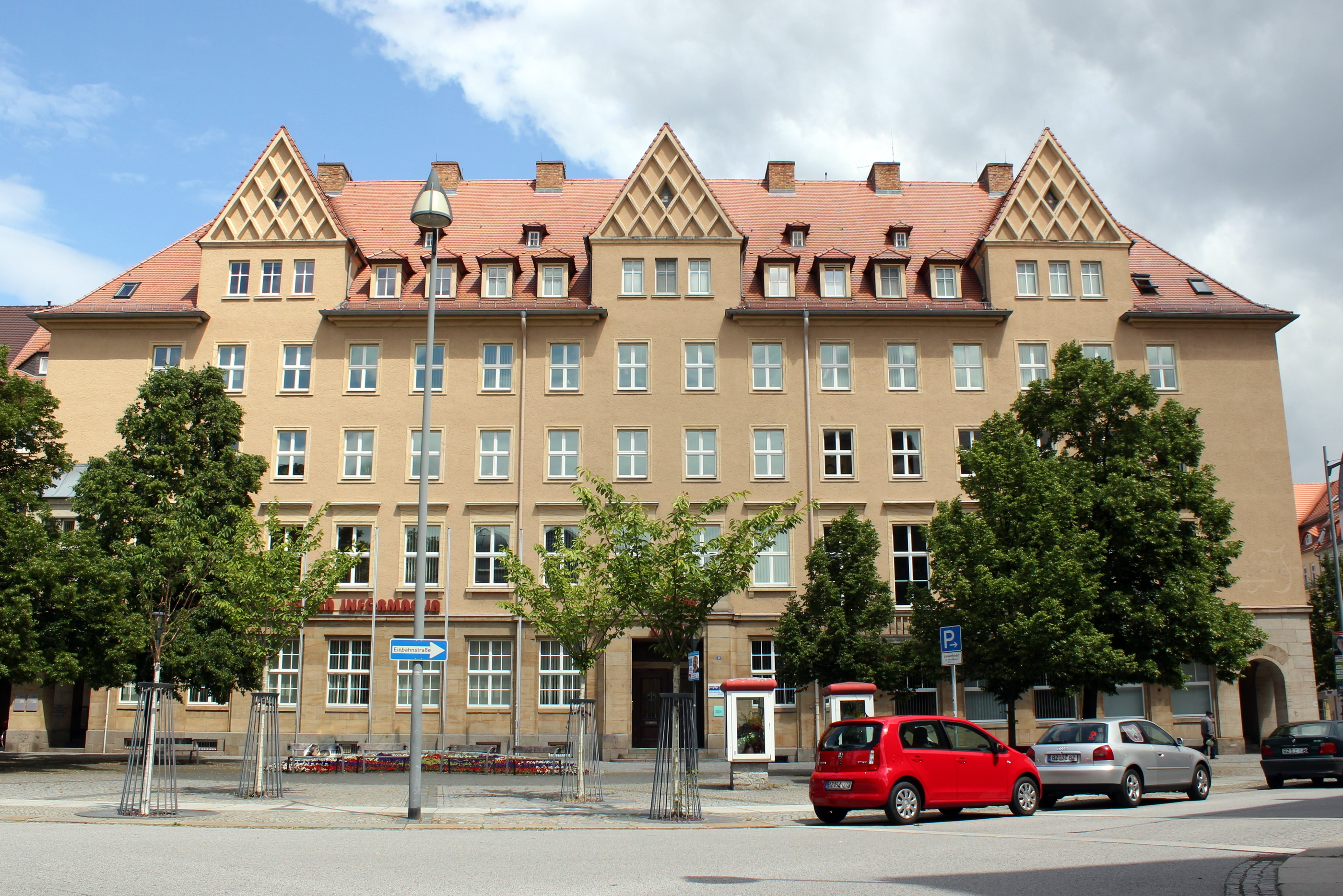
Serbski dom – seat of the Domowina in Bautzen

The Domowina has its main seat in the Serbski dom in Bautzen.

=== Branch offices ===
- Haus der Sorben Bautzen (Serbski dom Budyšin)
- Wendisches Haus Cottbus (Serbski dom Chóśebuz)

=== Regional offices ===
- Regionalbüro Kamenz (Kamjenc) in Crostwitz (Chrósćicy)
- Regionalbüro Hoyerswerda (Wojerecy)
- Regionalbüro Bautzen (Budyšin)
- Regionalbüro Weißwasser/Niesky (Běła Woda/Niska) in Schleife (Slepo)

== Chairmen ==
The actual chairman since 2011 is Dawid Statnik.

Period	Chairman
1912–1927	Arnošt Bart
1927–1930	Jakub Šewčik
1930–1933	Jan Křižan
1933–1950	Pawoł Nedo
1951–1973	Kurt Krjeńc
1964–1990	Jurij Grós
1990–1991	Bjarnat Cyž
1991–1992	Jan Pawoł Nagel
1993–2000	Jakub Brankačk
2000–2011	Jan Nuk
2011–present	David Statnik

== Association's journal ==
Domowina's association's journal was Naša Domowina ("Our Domowina"). Originally, it was created by Pawoł Nedo a supplement for the Serbske nowiny newspaper in 1935. Today, it bears the full name Naša Domowina – Informacije třěšneho zwjazka * Informacije kšywowego zwězka * Informationen des Dachverbandes ("Our Domowina – Information from the umbrella organization") in Upper Sorbian, Lower Sorbian and German. It is issued by the Bautzen branch office of Domowina. At the moment there is no journal, but newsletter.

== See also ==
- Dawid Statnik – Wikipedia
