= Serbski Sokoł =

Sorbian sports governing body

The association Serbski Sokoł ('Sorbian falcon') is the umbrella organization of Sorbian sports associations. It originated in the Slavic Sokol movement and still feels connected with these ideals. It was founded in 1993, resuming the activity of its eponymous predecessor from the era of the Weimar Republic. The main goal of Serbski Sokoł is to promote popular sports among Sorbs.

Today, the association organizes competitions in different team sports and takes part in international Sokol unions. It had its own magazine called Sokołske listy 1994 to 2006.

== History ==
The first Sorbian Sokoł unit (sorb. jednota) in Germany was founded 1920 in Bautzen. Its inspiration was the Czechoslovak Sokol movement. In 1924, the first association meeting took place in Panschwitz-Kuckau. The first president was Jan Skala. Until 1931, the movement spread across the Sorbian settlement area with new units being founded in various Sorbian villages and cities. The association fostered Sorbian nationalism and encouraged Sorbs to do sports. Serbski Sokoł started to participate in Allslavic Sokol unions in Czechoslovakia and Yugoslavia.

Parts of the Catholic clergy had mixed feelings about Serbski Sokoł since it facilitated close contact between Catholic and Protestant members and because the Czechoslovak Sokol was judged to be anti-church. Therefore, Serbski Sokoł was split into a Catholic and a protestand section in 1930.

Serbski Sokoł dissolved in 1933, while a decree to prohibit the association was already in preparation. The Eastern German government too did not approve of its revitalization in 1949.

After its reestablishment in 1993, Serbski Sokoł took part in the 1994 12th Allsokol-Union in Prague with about onehundert sportsmen. In 1996, it became a part of Domowina. Since then, Serbski Sokoł has its main office in the Serbski dom in Bautzen.
