= Jurij Grós =

Sorbian communist politician (1931–2019)

First Secretary of the Federal Executive Board of Domowina
- In office June 1964 – March 1990
- Preceded by: Kurt Krjeńc
- Succeeded by: Bjarnat Cyž

Member of the Volkskammer
- In office 1986–1990

Personal details
- Born: 1 January 1931; Bautzen, Weimar Republic
- Died: 28 December 2019; Bautzen, Germany
- Political party: The Left (2007–2019); Party of Democratic Socialism (Germany) (1990–2007); SED (1949–1989)
- Occupation: Politician
- Awards: Ćišinski Prize

Jurij Grós (1 January 1931 – 28 December 2019) was an ethnic Sorbian communist politician who held office before and after German reunification.

== Biography ==
Grós was born in Bautzen in 1931 and educated at the Sorbian Teacher Training Institute in Radibor. He joined the Socialist Unity Party of Germany (SED) in 1949 and worked as a teacher until 1953. He joined the district leadership of the Free German Youth (FDJ) and in 1955 became a member of the Federal Executive Board of Domowina, the state-sponsored association for the Sorbian minority. In 1964, he was appointed First Secretary of the Federal Executive Board, and assumed leadership of the organization upon the retirement of its long-time Chairman, Kurt Krjeńc in 1973. He was elected to the Central Council of the FDJ in 1959 and remained in office until 1971. In the 1986 East German general election, Grós was elected to the Volkskammer. In the wake of the Peaceful Revolution, he resigned his position in Domowina, but was re-elected to the executive board again in 1993. From 1994 to 1998, he chaired the Bautzen District association of the PDS (the successor party of the SED) and represented the PDS (later The Left) in the Bautzen District Council.
