= Dziedzice, Namysłów County =

Dziedzice
- Village
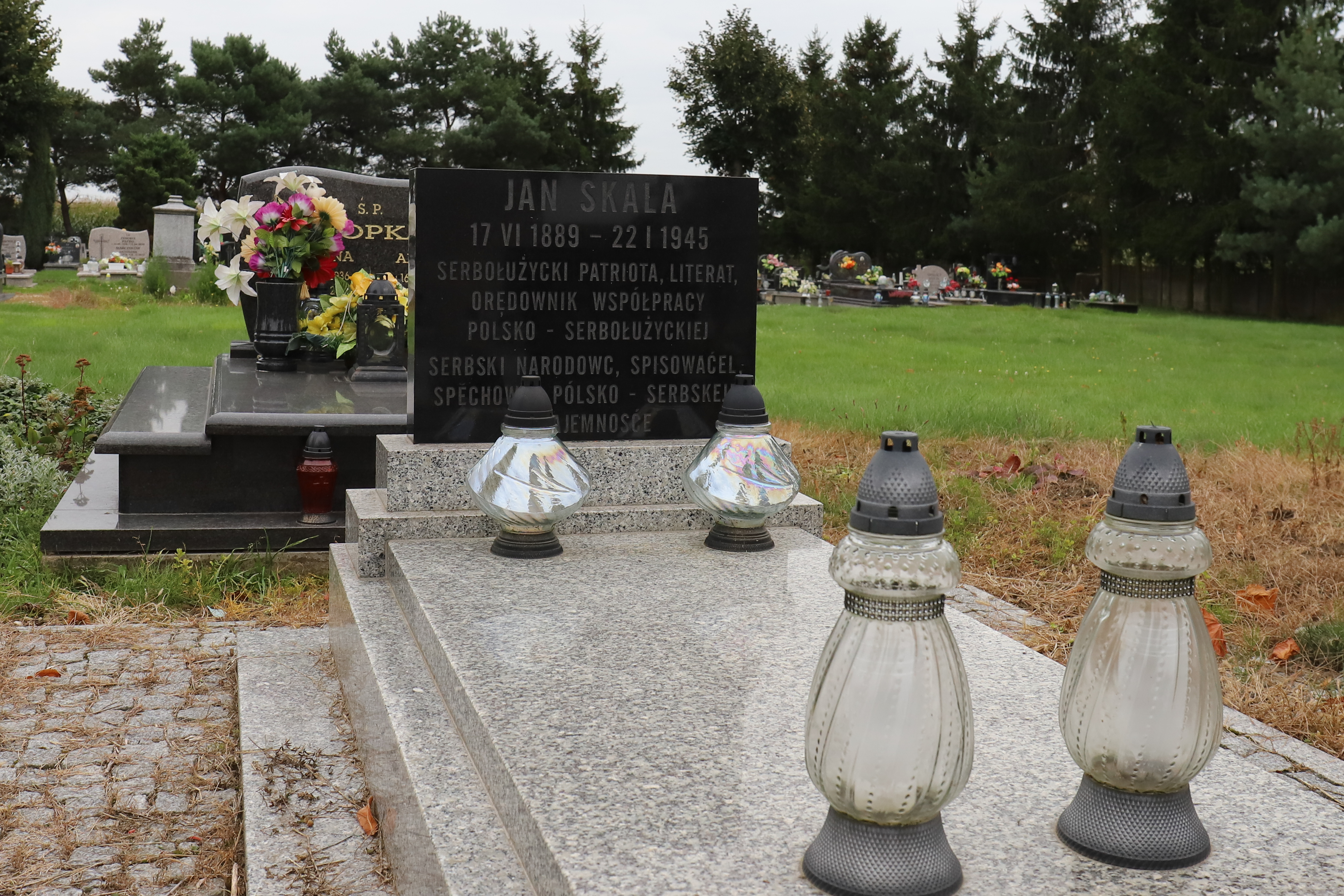
- Grave of Jan Skala

- Location within Poland
- Coordinates: 51°02′50″N 17°55′00″E
- Country: Poland
- Voivodeship: Opole
- County: Namysłów
- Gmina: Domaszowice
- First mentioned: 1254
- Time zone: UTC+1 (CET)
  - Summer (DST): UTC+2 (CEST)
- Vehicle registration: ONA

Dziedzice [d͡ʑɛˈd͡ʑit͡sɛ] is a village in the administrative district of Gmina Domaszowice, within Namysłów County, Opole Voivodeship, in southern Poland.

The name is of Polish origin and comes from the word dziedzic, which means "heir".

During World War II, Sorbian journalist, poet and activist Jan Skala, who closely cooperated with the Poles, was murdered in the village by a Soviet soldier on 22 January 1945. His grave at the local cemetery is a Polish protected cultural heritage monument.
