= Sorbian Museum =

Museum in Bautzen, Germany

- Serbski Muzej/Sorbisches Museum
- Established: 1988
- Location: Ortenburg, Bautzen, Germany
- Coordinates: 51.1834°N 14.4193°E
- Director: Christina Bogusz
- Owner: District of Bautzen
- Website: https://sorbisches-museum.de/

The Sorbian Museum, Upper Sorbian: Serbski muzej (pronounced [ˈsɛʁpskʲi muˈzɛj]), German: Sorbisches Museum, is hosted in the salthouse of the Ortenburg, Bautzen. It houses approximately 35,000 inventarized objects, making it the most important museum of Sorbian culture and history.

== History ==
The association Maćica Serbska included the establishment of a Sorbian museum on their agenda in 1856. It was the first institution to collect ethnological and historical objects connected to the Sorbs.

For an 1896 exhibition of Saxon arts and crafts in Dresden, exhibits were collected and presented by Sorbian institutions in the so-called Wendish village. When the Serbski dom was inaugurated in 1904, the Sorbian Museum was opened simultaneously on the third floor. The closure of the Serbski dom by the Nazi government in 1937 put an end to the first Sorbian Museum. In 1942, its collection was included in the municipal museum of Bautzen.

In the German Democratic Republic (GDR), a museum of Sorbian history and ethnology was founded in 1957 in Hoyerswerda. As objects of the former Wendish Museum kept being restituted, the museum moved to Bautzen due to a shortage of space. The salthouse of the Ortenburg in Bautzen was chosen as the new seat of the Sorbian Museum, since the original building was destroyed in 1945 and the Serbski dom, its replacement, was not built to include the museum. It became part of the municipal museums of Bautzen. In 1988, the exhibition was redesigned and the Sorbian Museum reopened as an independent institution.

== Location at the salthouse ==
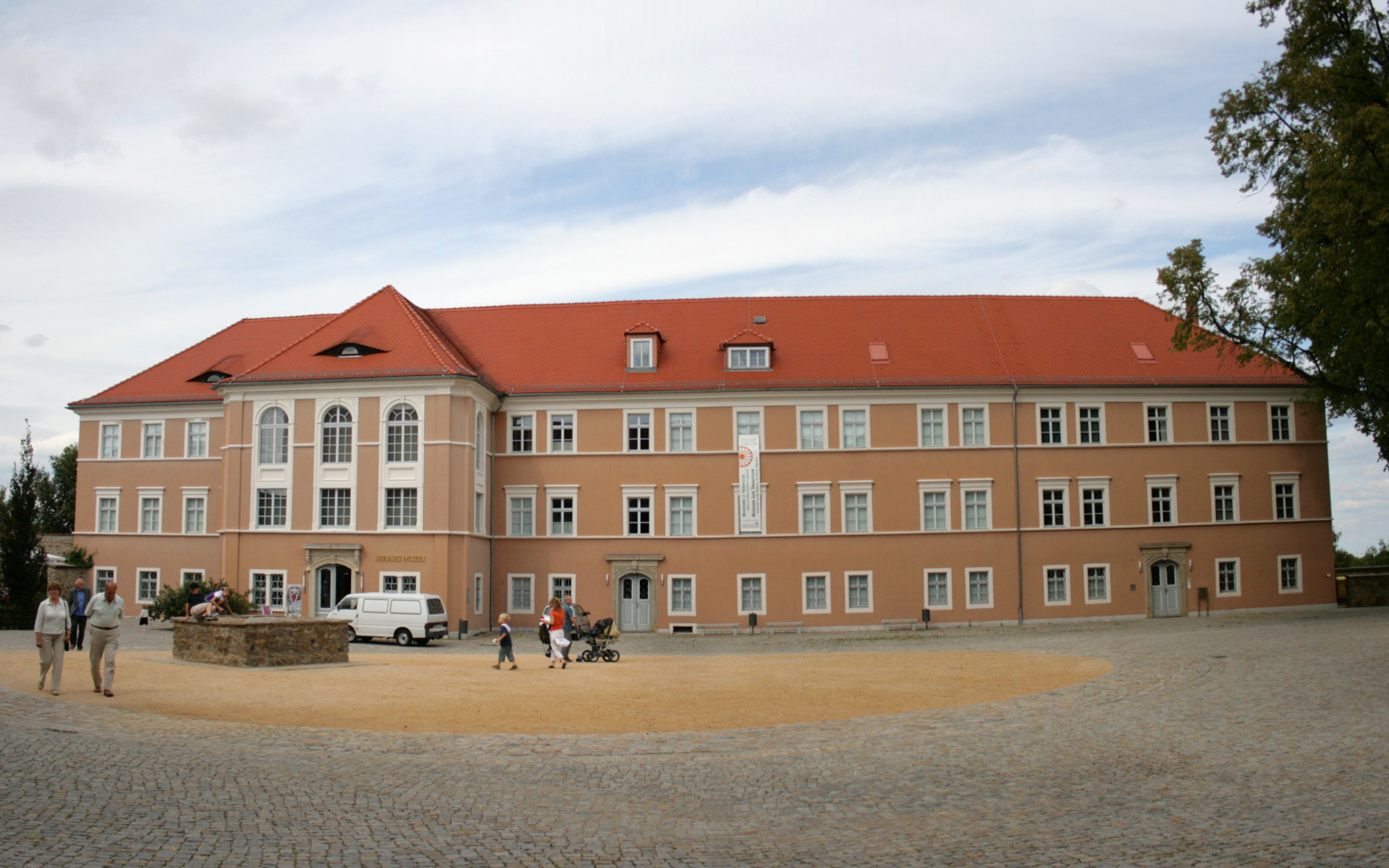
The former salthouse of Ortenburg Castle, Bautzen, accommodates the Sorbian museum

The building currently accommodating the museum was built in 1782 as a salthouse and was restructured in 1869 providing its present from. Since 1835 it was the seat of the Royal Saxon Court of Appeals, the highest judicial institution in Lusatia. During the time of Nazi Germany, it hosted the Gestapo, and it later became a residential building in the German Democratic Republic. After the original location, the Serbski dom, was destroyed in 1945, the salthouse was determined to be a worthy accommodation for the Sorbian Museum in 1976 in spite of it not having a connection to the Sorbian people and despite its past use by the Gestapo. The salthouse was extensively restored in 2003.

== Exhibitions ==
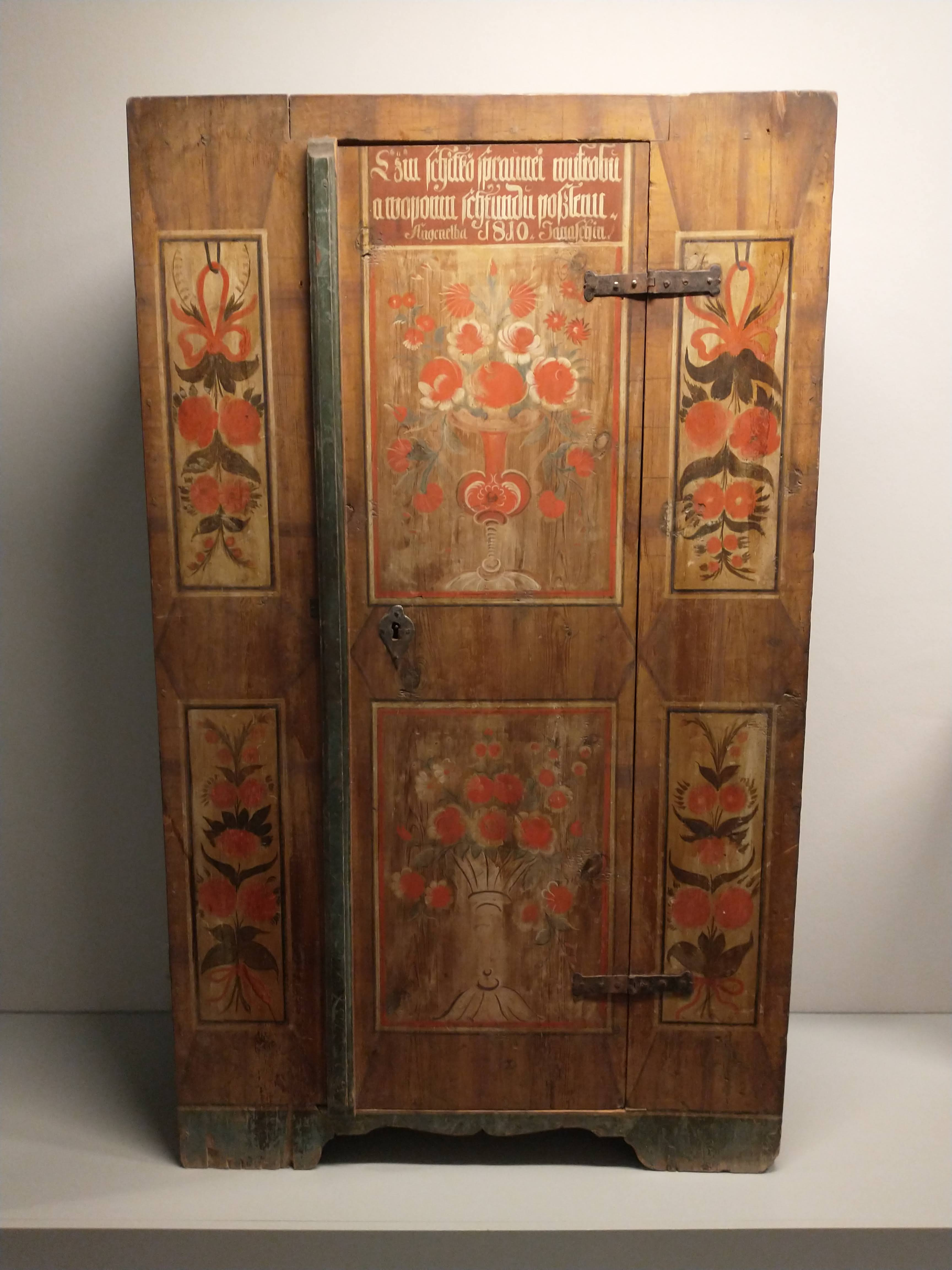
Painted cupboard from the collection of the museum

The exhibition provides information on Sorbian history and culture in Lusatia. Its main focus lies on the Sorbian language, literature and art.
