= Schleifer dialect =

Transitional Sorbian dialect of Germany

- Slepjanska narěč
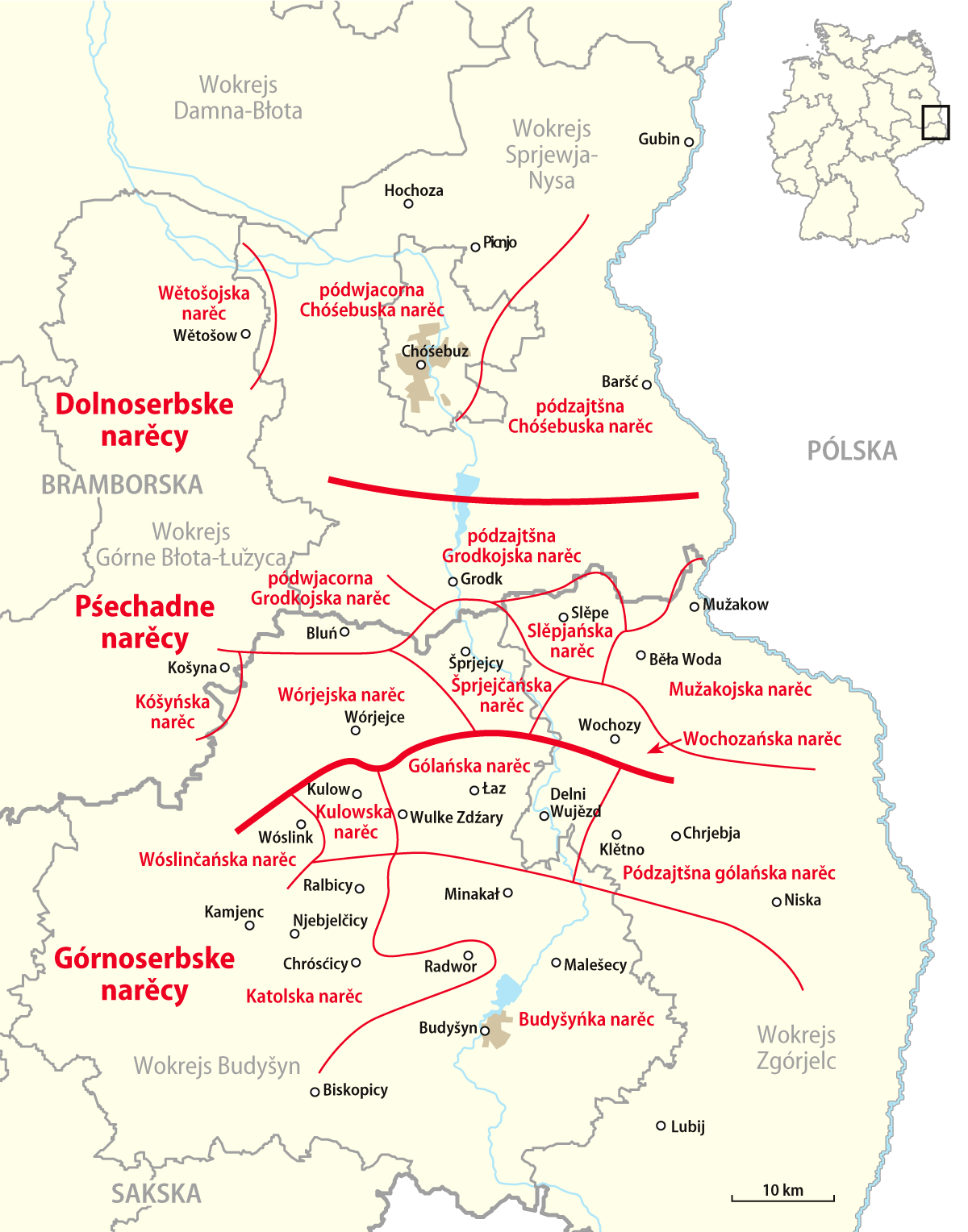
- Map of the Sorbian dialects, Lower Sorbian version
- Native to: Germany
- Region: Upper Lusatia
- Ethnicity: Sorbs
- Native speakers: (undated figure of less than 1,000)
- Language family: Indo-European: Balto-Slavic; Slavic; West Slavic; Sorbian; Lower Sorbian; Eastern; Schleifer dialect
- Writing system: Latin (Sorbian alphabet)

Language codes
- ISO 639-3: –
- Glottolog: schl1238
- Linguasphere: 53-AAA-bah

The Schleifer dialect (Sorbian languages: Slepjanska narěč, Lower Sorbian: [ˈslɛpʲanska ˈnarʲɛtʃ], Upper Sorbian: [- ˈnaʁʲɛtʃ]) is a transitional dialect of the Upper and Lower Sorbian languages spoken in the Schleife region. Among the Sorbian dialects, the Schleifer dialect is most closely related to the Muskau dialect, whose language territory borders to the east. These two dialects are assigned to Lower Sorbian rather than Upper Sorbian by Slavists.

The Schleifer dialect is mainly passed on orally and has no modern written language of its own. Therefore, documents in the Schleifer dialect do not correspond to any standardized grammar or are mixed with one of the two standard languages.

The Sorbian half-farmer Hanzo Njepila from Rohne, who was the first non-clerical writer to write in Sorbian, wrote his texts exclusively in the Schleifer dialect. One of the largest collections of historical inscriptions in the Schleifer dialect can also be found on the historical gravestones of the cemetery in Rohne.

Within the distribution area, which almost coincides with that of Schleifer Tracht, there are slight differences between Groß Düben and Halbendorf on the one hand, and the other five villages on the other.

The association Kólesko, founded in 2011, is concerned with the documentation, publication and maintenance of the Schleifer dialect, the songs and the Schleifer costume. The Kólesko members Juliana Kaulfürst and Dieter Reddo received the Zejler Award of the Saxon State Ministry for Science, Culture and Tourism in 2018 for their "outstanding contribution to the revitalization of Schleifer Sorbian".
