= Kurt Krjeńc =

East German communist politician (1907–1978)

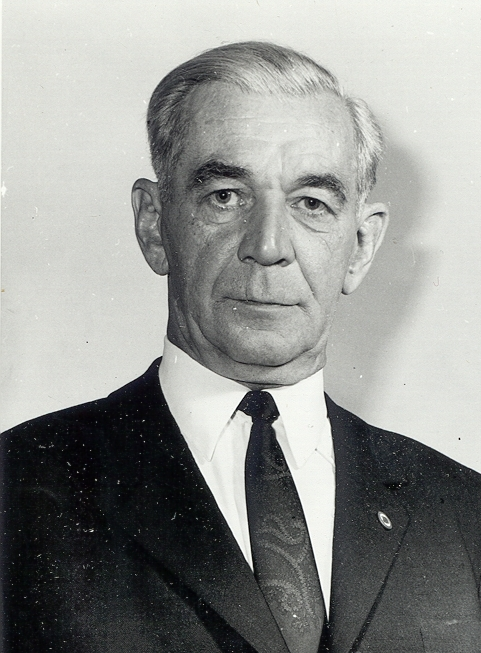

Chairman of Domowina
- In office 1951–1973
- Preceded by: Pawoł Nedo
- Succeeded by: Jurij Grós (as Secretary)

Member of the Volkskammer
- In office 1950–1978

Personal details
- Born: 7 July 1907 Malschwitz, German Empire
- Died: 28 November 1978 (aged 71) Bautzen, German Democratic Republic
- Party: SED
- Occupation: Politician
- Awards: Order of Karl Marx; Patriotic Order of Merit in Gold

Kurt Krjeńc (7 July 1907 – 28 November 1978) was an East German communist politician who served as Chairman of Domowina from 1951 to 1973.

== Biography ==
Krjeńc was born in Malschwitz near Bautzen in 1907 to an ethnic Sorbian working-class mining family and apprenticed as a porcelain turner. He joined the Communist Party of Germany in 1923 and was arrested and served time in a concentration camp after Adolf Hitler's rise to power as a political prisoner. He did mandatory service in the Wehrmacht during the Second World War and was captured by the Red Army in May 1945. In the Soviet Occupation Zone, he worked as a district secretary for the newly formed Socialist Unity Party. Following the creation of the German Democratic Republic, he was elected to the Volkskammer, and held a seat in the chamber until his death in 1978. From 1951 to 1973, Krjeńc served as Chairman of Domowina, a state-sponsored association for ethnic Sorbs which was a constituent organization of the National Front. Following his resignation for health reasons, the title of Chairman of Domowina was formally abolished, and his successors instead used the title Secretary of the Federal Executive Board.
