= Jan Skala =

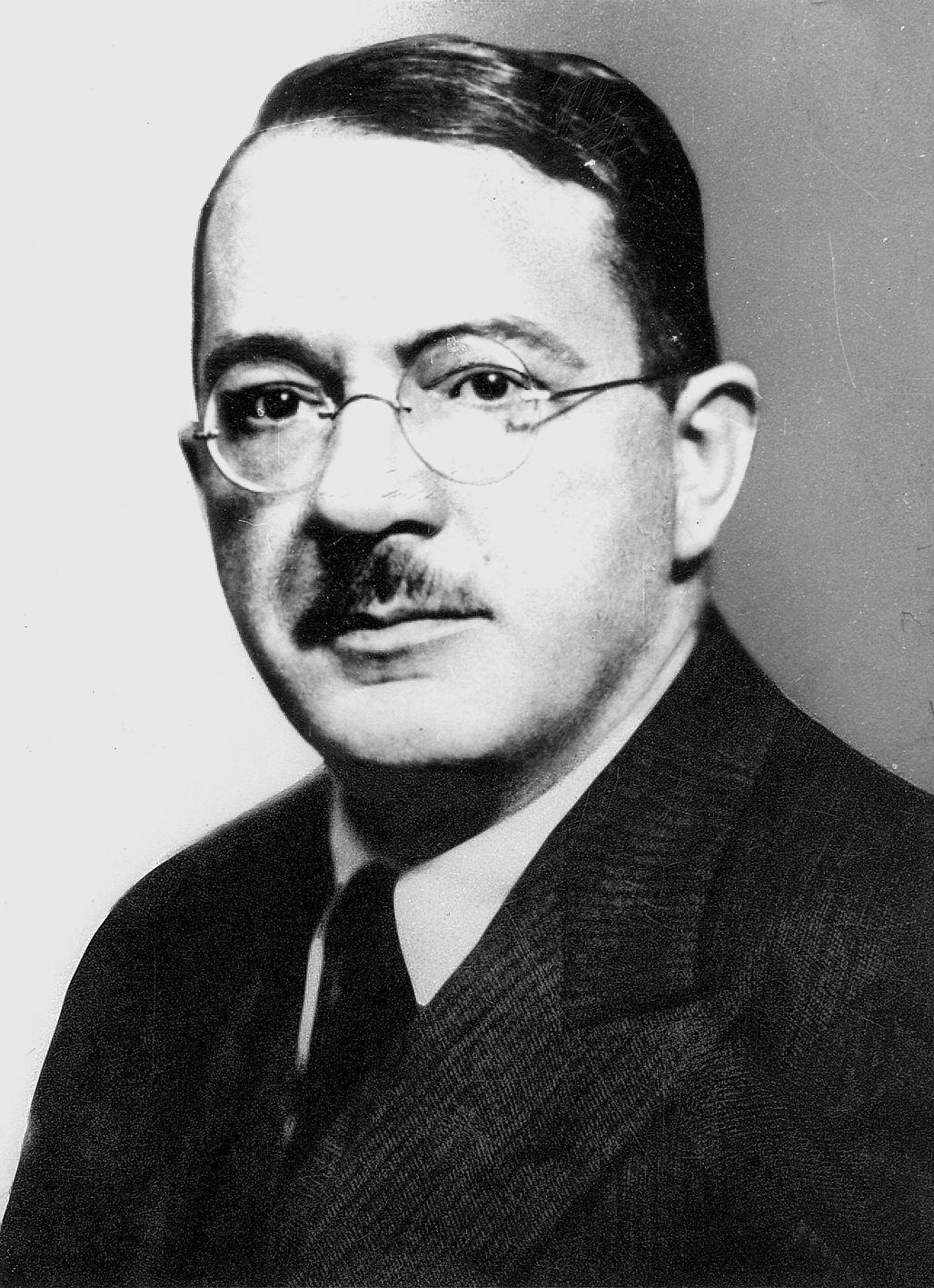
Jan Skala (c. 1930)

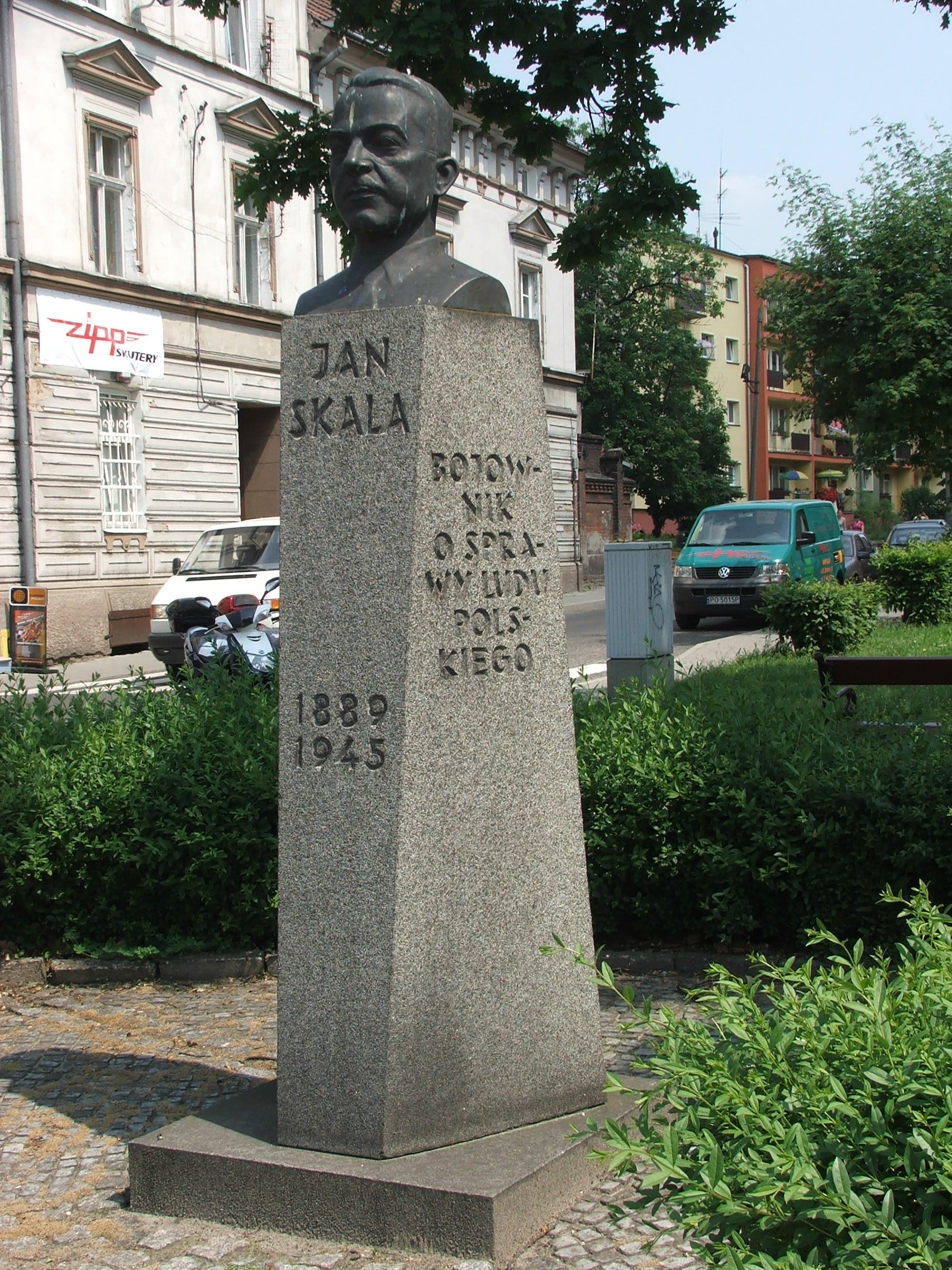
Bust of Jan Skala in Namysłów

Jan Skala (17 June 1889 – 22 January 1945) was a Sorbian journalist, poet and leading ideologist of the Sorbian national movement. In the interwar period (1918–1939) he was active in the Association of National Minorities in Germany for the rights of non-German ethnic groups in Germany.

== Life ==
Jan Skala was born on 17 June 1889 in Nebelschütz, Germany. He was son of a quarry worker and a Sorbian costume seamstress. After finishing Bautzen Domschule in 1901 he spent a year in the Catholic Teachers' Preparatory College. He published his Sorbian poems in 1910 and, earlier, some articles in social democratic papers. As a soldier in Russia and Serbia in 1916–1918, he deepened his knowledge of Slavic languages.

From 1918 to 1919, Jan was working for the Berlin Versorgungsamt. During the Spartacist riots he worked for the Berlin Security Corps. After he got a position with the Ordnance Department of the Berlin police in Moabit. From 1919 to 1920 Jan was editor of the political newspaper Serbski Dźenik in Weißwasser, and a co-founder of the People's Party and Lusatian Sorbian sports association Serbski Sokoł. In 1921 he shortly worked for Sorbian newspaper Serbske Nowiny, then moved to Prague where he got a position at the government newspaper Prager Presse. In January 1924 Jan edited Sorbian newspaper Serbske Nowiny and started working for Union of Poles in Berlin. In 1925 to 1927 he participated in the work of the International Congress of National Minorities in Geneva, where he established contacts with progressive politicians and pacifists. He maintained contact with democratic intellectuals in Czechoslovakia and Poland.

After the Nazis came to power he was persecuted for his past political activities. In 1936, he was banned as a journalist and his name was deleted from the list of German writers. In 1937 he left Berlin and moved to Bautzen. On January 21, 1938, Skala was arrested together with Cyž and Měrćink; all accused for conspiracy to commit treason. The People's Court in Berlin, on 1 June 1939, convicted Cyž and Měrćink of treason. The accused Skala was, for health reasons, released from the prison already on 26 October 1938.

From 1939 to 1943 he worked at various Bautzen and Berlin companies. In 1943 he escaped the Berlin bombing and moved to his wife's family in Dziedzice (Erbenfeld). From 1943 to 1945 he worked at Elektroakustik in Namysłow, where he supported Polish resistance fighters. On January 22, 1945, he was killed in Dziedzice by a Soviet Army soldier.

== Work ==
Jan Skala was a Lusatian Sorb left-leaning leader and patriot, journalist and well-known poet and writer. Skala, as a poet and in his twentieth year, was writing in German Socialist papers. In his mother-tongue he commenced writing verses in 1911. He introduced into his writings more of the social than the romantic or patriotic notes that had marked the older Lusatian Sorbs writers. After the WWI he published two books of poetry: "Drobjence" ("The Crumbs") in 1920. and Škre ("The Sparks") in 1923. "The Crumbs" poems were of strong patriotic tone influenced by another Sorbian poet Čišinski. One of the poems was a call for help and support in his struggle for the Sorbian rights in Germany directed to Serbs. "The Sparks" were love and intimate poems. As a writer Jan is known for some short narratives, the most important of them "Stary Šymko"(“The Old Schimko”) in which he describes how the capitalistic major industries exploited and swindled the Wends who lived in the moors. An anthology of his poetry was published in 1985 under the Jan Skala title and edited by J. Łušćanski and K. Lorenc.

For his service in the Union of Poles he was seen as a leader of the Polish minority in Germany. Jan insisted on cultural autonomy of Poles and Sorbs insisting that the existing cultural autonomy was geared to the better-organized and more affluent minorities—the Auslandsdeutschen above all. Further, he claimed that the Nationalities Congress was little more than a cloak for the extension of German influence. On the opposite side, he saw that the inability of poorer minorities to achieve cultural autonomy would lead to their assimilation. During his struggle for the minorities rights in 1930s in the German Reich, in April 1936 he published two articles in "Slavonic and East European Review", the organ of School of Slavic and East European Studies in the University of London, under his Sorabicus pen-name.

== Honours ==
In the Polish city Namysłów a monument was erected to Jan Skala in 1965. In Bautzen, Germany a street was named after Jan Skala.

== Literature ==
- Gmejna Njebjelčicy: Kultur->Sorben->Jan Skala
- Nationalistische Macht und nationale Minderheit: Jan Skala (1889-1945) : ein Sorbe in Deutschland by Peter Jan Joachim Kroh, Homilius, 2009
- Jan Skala
