= Schleife =

Schleife Slepo
- Municipality
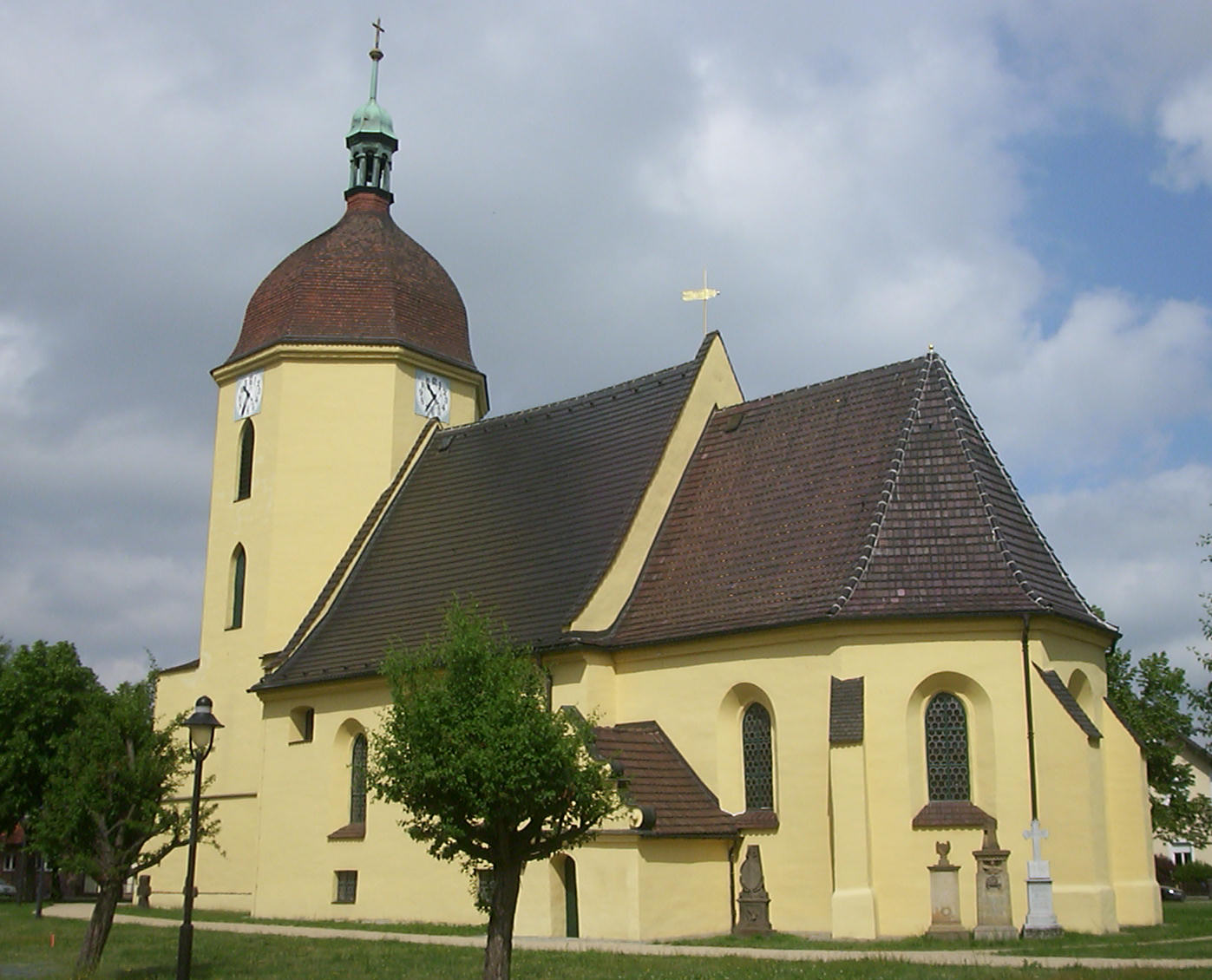

- Location of Schleife within Görlitz district
- Interactive map of Schleife
- Location within Germany Location within Saxony
- Coordinates: 51°32′N 14°32′E
- Country: Germany
- State: Saxony
- District: Görlitz
- Subdivisions: 3

Government
  - Mayor (2020–27): Jörg Funda (CDU)

Area
  - Total: 42 km^{2} (16 sq mi)
- Elevation: 129 m (423 ft)

Population (2025-12-31)
  - Total: 2,503
  - Density: 60/km^{2} (150/sq mi)
- Demonym(s): German: Schleifer; Upper Sorbian: Slepjan (m.), Slepjanka (f.)
- Time zone: UTC+01:00 (CET)
  - Summer (DST): UTC+02:00 (CEST)
- Postal codes: 02959
- Dialling codes: 035773
- Vehicle registration: GR, LÖB, NOL, NY, WSW, ZI
- Website: www.schleife-slepo.de

Schleife (German pronunciation: [ˈʃlaɪfə]; Upper Sorbian: Slepo, pronounced [ˈslɛpɔ]) is a municipality of 3,000 in northern Görlitz district, northeast Saxony, Germany. It is the seat of the Verwaltungsgemeinschaft Schleife (about 5,000 inhabitants).

The municipality is part of the recognized Sorbian settlement area in Saxony. Upper Sorbian has an official status next to German, all villages bear names in both languages.

== Toponymy ==
The name is thought to derive from the Slavic word slip ("to murmur"), possibly referring to the murmuring sound made when walking on marshy ground. According to Meschgang, Schleife (Slepo) developed from a place where water would seep out of the ground when someone walked over it, from the Old Slavic slěpati, meaning "to well up" or "to gush forth." Eichler and Walther, however, consider it more likely that the name is based on the Old Sorbian adjective slěpy, meaning "blind." In that case, Schleife would mean "a place by the murky (or clouded) stream."

== History ==
The village of Schleife was first mentioned in historical records on January 21, 1272, under the name Slepe. At that time, settlement of the Schleife region—likely begun by Sorbs from Lower Lusatia during the 12th or early 13th century—was well underway. Despite its proximity to the ancient settlement area of the Lordship of Muskau, the villages remained under the direct ownership of the territorial rulers.

By the late 14th century, Schleife had become the seat of the noble von Köckritz family, originally from the Vogtland region, who also owned estates in Lower Lusatia. The family's presence in Schleife disappears from the historical record around 1430. By the mid-15th century, Schleife and several neighboring villages belonged to the Muskau parish. To reduce the debts of the Lordship of Muskau, Wenceslaus von Biberstein sold the tax revenues from Schleife and Rohne to St. Marienstern Abbey in 1464 for 200 shock groschen. During a long-running dispute between the Biberstein family and King Ferdinand I, the Catholic priest of Schleife was expelled by Sigmund von Biberstein in 1541 and replaced by a Protestant preacher.

During the Thirty Years' War (1618–1648), Schleife's location on the Lower Military Road, an important route connecting Leipzig with Warsaw via Spremberg, Muskau, and Sorau, proved disastrous. Between 1630 and 1647, 21 of the village's 40 farms were abandoned due to troop movements and the destruction they caused.

Near the end of the war, the Lordship of Muskau passed by marriage to the Counts of Callenberg. Between 1678 and 1690, Curt Reinicke II von Callenberg quarreled with the peasants of the Schleife parish over unpaid compulsory labor (corvée). What began as a dispute with farmers from Schleife later spread to Mulkwitz, Mühlrose, and Rohne. Determined to crush the resistance, he made full use of his feudal authority, causing several farmers to flee to neighboring Hoyerswerda or Lieskau. In 1730, his son, Count Alexander von Callenberg, established a school in Schleife.

During the Wars of Liberation against Napoleon, troops from both sides marched through Schleife. Because the Kingdom of Saxony had fought alongside France, it was forced in 1815 to cede eastern Upper Lusatia to the Kingdom of Prussia. Schleife became part of the newly established Rothenburg district in the Province of Silesia in 1816.

Legal disputes delayed the abolition of the feudal system in Schleife until 1858. In 1873, the Schleife manor became the ninth and last of twenty estate farms belonging to the Lordship of Muskau to be abandoned due to poor economic returns.

On the night of June 2–3, 1889, a farm caught fire. Strong easterly winds quickly spread the flames, and within a short time 31 buildings were burning. Eleven farmsteads on both sides of the village street were destroyed.

The disaster is commemorated by a memorial plaque bearing the inscription "Eben-Ezer" ("Stone of God's Help," meaning "Thus far the Lord has helped us"), which was built into the rebuilt house on the last affected farmstead.

The Cottbus–Görlitz railway, operated by the Berlin–Görlitz Railway Company, was built south of Schleife in 1867. Before the turn of the century, the station was expanded to include a post office, passenger waiting room, railway workers' housing, and freight facilities. On August 7, 1905, a head-on collision between two trains occurred between Spremberg and Schleife due to human error, killing 19 people and seriously injuring 40 others.

In 1914, the municipality purchased land from Count Traugott Herrmann von Arnim-Muskau, extending from the Struga River to the railway. In 1920, another 150 morgens of forest beyond the railway were purchased from his adopted son and successor, Count Adolf von Arnim-Muskau. These lands were divided into building plots and sold, creating a new settlement. Combined with the arrival of refugees from Germany's lost eastern territories after World War I, this led to rapid population growth. Although Schleife had already been electrified before World War I, a 100-kV power line from Trattendorf Power Station to Sagan was routed through the village in 1926. It was dismantled in 1946 as part of Soviet war reparations.

After the Nazi Party came to power, surveying work began west of Schleife in 1934 for what was officially described as a "chicken farm." In reality, construction began the following year on the Weißwasser Air Force Main Ammunition Depot (Muna). A railway spur connected the complex, allowing transportation of workers and materials. Before World War II, the site included housing, production and administration buildings, fuel depots, and 100 ammunition bunkers with a combined storage capacity exceeding 2,500 tons. The Muna became one of the area's largest employers, with 300–400 workers producing artillery shells ranging from 2 cm to 12.8 cm in caliber. As more men were drafted into military service, women and prisoners from Belarus and Ukraine filled labor shortages. In February 1945, the ammunition depot was evacuated and relocated to Langlau in Franconia. Unlike the depot itself, which was never bombed from the air, the evacuation convoys were repeatedly attacked by Allied fighter aircraft.

Schleife itself was bombed several times during the final months of the war. On April 10, 1945, with the third defensive line of the Neisse Front under construction, Field Marshal Ferdinand Schörner landed in Schleife to inspect both the ammunition depot and German defensive positions. In nearby Weißwasser, he ordered soldiers executed for alleged cowardice.

On April 16, 1945, the Soviet offensive across the Oder-Neisse Line began—the last major battle of the war on German soil. That afternoon, Schleife was attacked by low-flying aircraft using bombs, cannon fire, and machine guns. Most residents fled at dusk toward Neustadt/Spree, then via Burghammer south of Hoyerswerda to Wittichenau. After fierce fighting, Soviet forces captured the intact ammunition depot. By the evening of April 17, a white flag was flying from the church tower. The Red Army continued its advance, reaching the River Spree the following day. The refugee convoy continued through Kamenz, Brauna, Reichenbach, and finally to Wachau. When Wachau was evacuated on May 7, the refugees moved onward through Langebrück, the Dresden Heath, and Weißer Hirsch, with some crossing the Elbe River.

Following Germany's surrender, the refugees returned to Schleife on May 15–16, 1945, traveling along Reichsstraße 97 through Burg, Burghammer, and Neustadt. Along the way they suffered looting. When they arrived, they found a heavily damaged village. The church had been badly damaged, eleven farms, eight additional houses, and 28 barns and stables had been completely destroyed. Many homes had been looted, and livestock had disappeared. For approximately eight weeks, the dead were recovered and buried. Soviet soldiers who had fallen in and around Schleife were interred at the Red Army Heroes' Cemetery in Trebendorf.

Parts of the former ammunition depot were demolished, while the remaining facilities were used by the Red Army as a base for around 300 soldiers. During the German Democratic Republic (GDR), the site was converted into a fuel storage depot with a capacity of approximately 70 million liters. Other buildings were used as an administrative training school and, for a time, as a kindergarten.

Following the administrative reform of 1952, which abolished the German states in East Germany and created districts, Schleife became part of the Weißwasser district within the Bezirk Cottbus.

In 1959, Schleife still had no Agricultural Production Cooperative (LPG). Since even the mayor refused to establish one—reportedly saying, "I'd rather register as unemployed"—both he and his deputy were removed from office. In March 1960, so-called Red Brigades arrived in Schleife and pressured farmers into "voluntarily" joining the cooperative, often ignoring legal procedures. Under intense psychological pressure and fearing imprisonment, the farmers eventually established an LPG.

Until 1969, lignite was mined near the municipal boundary in the Trebendorfer Felder open-pit mine. At the same time, the nearby Nochten open-cast mine became another major employer. The village's growing population repeatedly exceeded the capacity of the local school. Construction of a new school complex for approximately 700 students began in 1968, and it was completed in two stages in 1971 and 1972.

Following German reunification and the withdrawal of the Soviet Army, the former ammunition depot required extensive environmental cleanup. Over time, the site was gradually opened for use by local organizations. For example, the Schleife Shooting Club established a shooting sports facility there.

== Administration ==
During the 1990s, there were municipal reforms in Saxony to make the administration more effective and less expensive. In that time, Schleife was joined by the two villages of Mulkwitz and Rohne, and the Verwaltungsgemeinschaft Schleife, based on the parish of Schleife, was established.

The parish of Schleife consists of eight villages, except for Lieskau the Verwaltungsgemeinschaft Schleife is formed by them:

German name	Sorbian name	municipality
Groß Düben	Dźewin	Groß Düben
Halbendorf	Brězowka	Groß Düben
Lieskau	Lěsk	
Mühlrose	Miłoraz	Trebendorf
Mulkwitz	Mułkecy	Schleife
Rohne	Rowne	Schleife
Schleife	Slepo	Schleife
Trebendorf	Trjebin	Trebendorf

Lieskau is a special case, it is located in the state of Brandenburg. Since 2003 it belongs to the town of Spremberg.

== Demography ==
For his statistical survey of the Sorbian population in Upper Lusatia, Arnošt Muka determined in the 1880s that Schleife had a population of 615, including 595 Sorbs (97%) and 20 Germans.

In 1956, Ernst Tschernik found that the proportion of Sorbian speakers had declined to 44.9%. This decrease was primarily caused by the ongoing industrialization of the region and the influx of German-speaking resettlers from the former eastern territories.

== Parish of Schleife ==
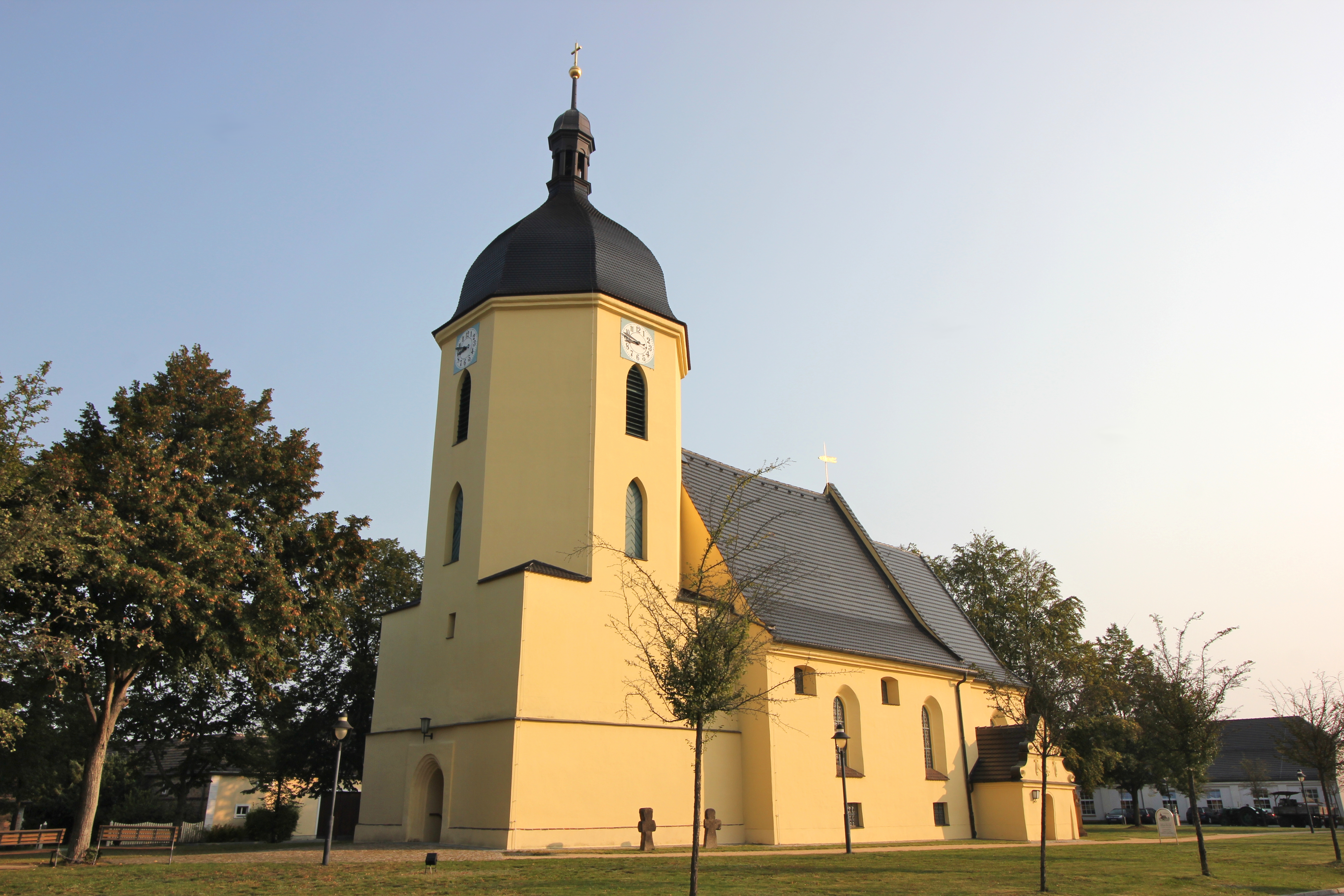
The landmark of the Schleife is its Late Gothic parish church, distinguished by its characteristically squat tower.

The majority of the religious population belongs to the Protestant (Evangelical Lutheran) Church. The Parish of Schleife includes the seven villages of the municipal association: Groß Düben, Halbendorf, Mulkwitz, Mühlrose, Rohne, Schleife, and Trebendorf. It also includes the Brandenburg village of Lieskau. Until the early 1920s, Neustadt/Spree and the Ruhlmühle district of Mühlrose belonged to the Parish of Spreewitz.

Within the Schleife Sorbian traditional costume, there is a special version worn specifically for attending church. Schleife also holds Sorbian-language and bilingual (German–Sorbian) church services.

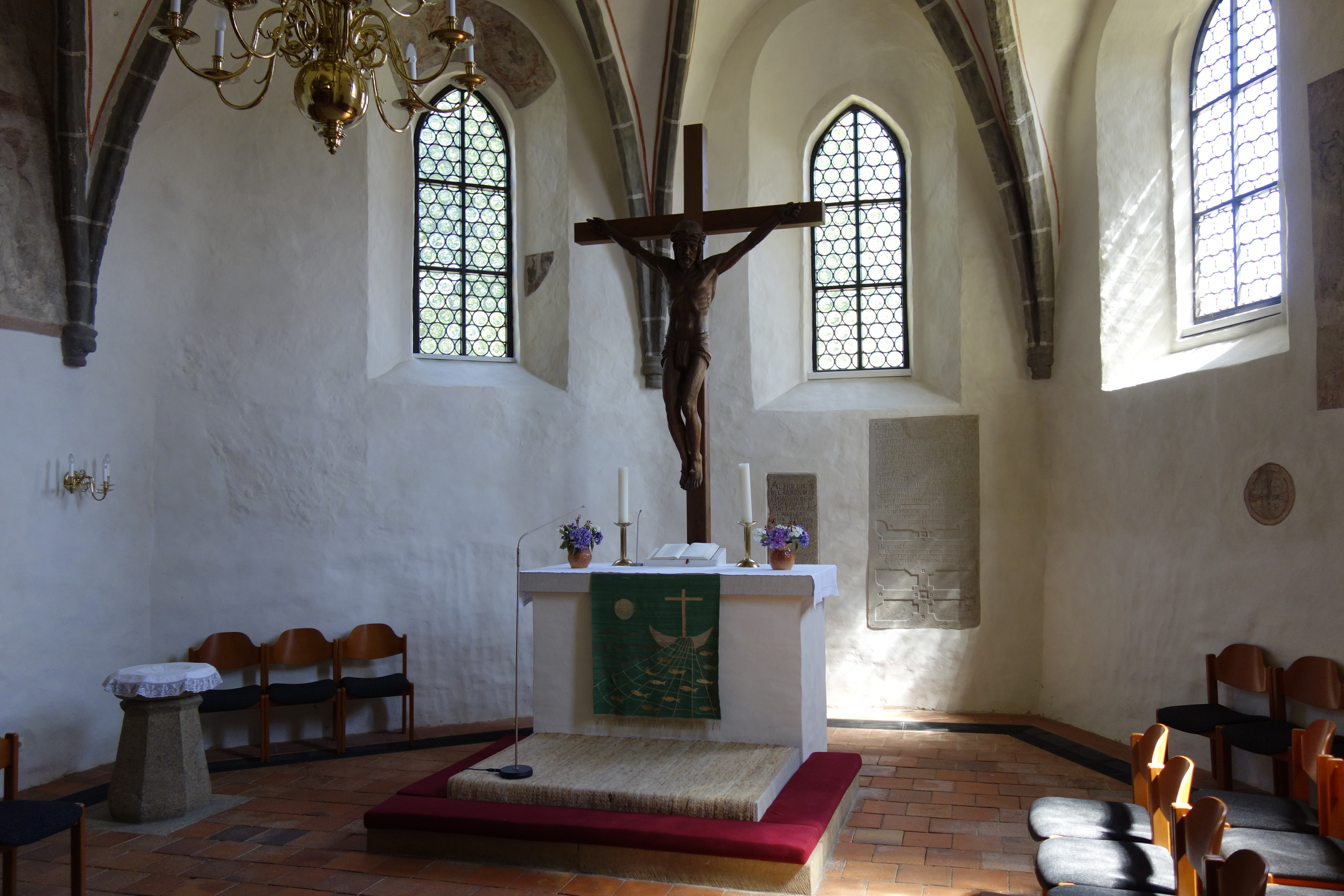
The altar of the church in 2017

The Parish Church of Schleife (Slepjanska cyrkej) was first mentioned in historical records in 1346. The church in Tzschelln, documented in 1495, was a daughter church (filial church) of Schleife until 1588, after which it became subordinate to Nochten. The chancel (altar area) of the Schleife church is the only surviving example of Late Gothic architecture in the region. Around 1685, the church nave was added. During a major renovation in 1859, the church received its first organ. Another interior renovation featured work by William Krause, a Dresden painter who spent the summers from 1902 to 1912 in Schleife and maintained a studio in the parish house.

During the final battles of World War II, on April 16 to 17, 1945, the church was heavily damaged. Reconstruction was completed by October 1946. A new crucifix was installed in 1948. It was carved by the Silesian-born artist Dorothea von Philipsborn, who had fled to the region after the war and completed the work by hand while living in Trebendorf.

In addition to the Evangelical parish, Schleife also has an Evangelical Free Church congregation.

== Sorbian culture ==
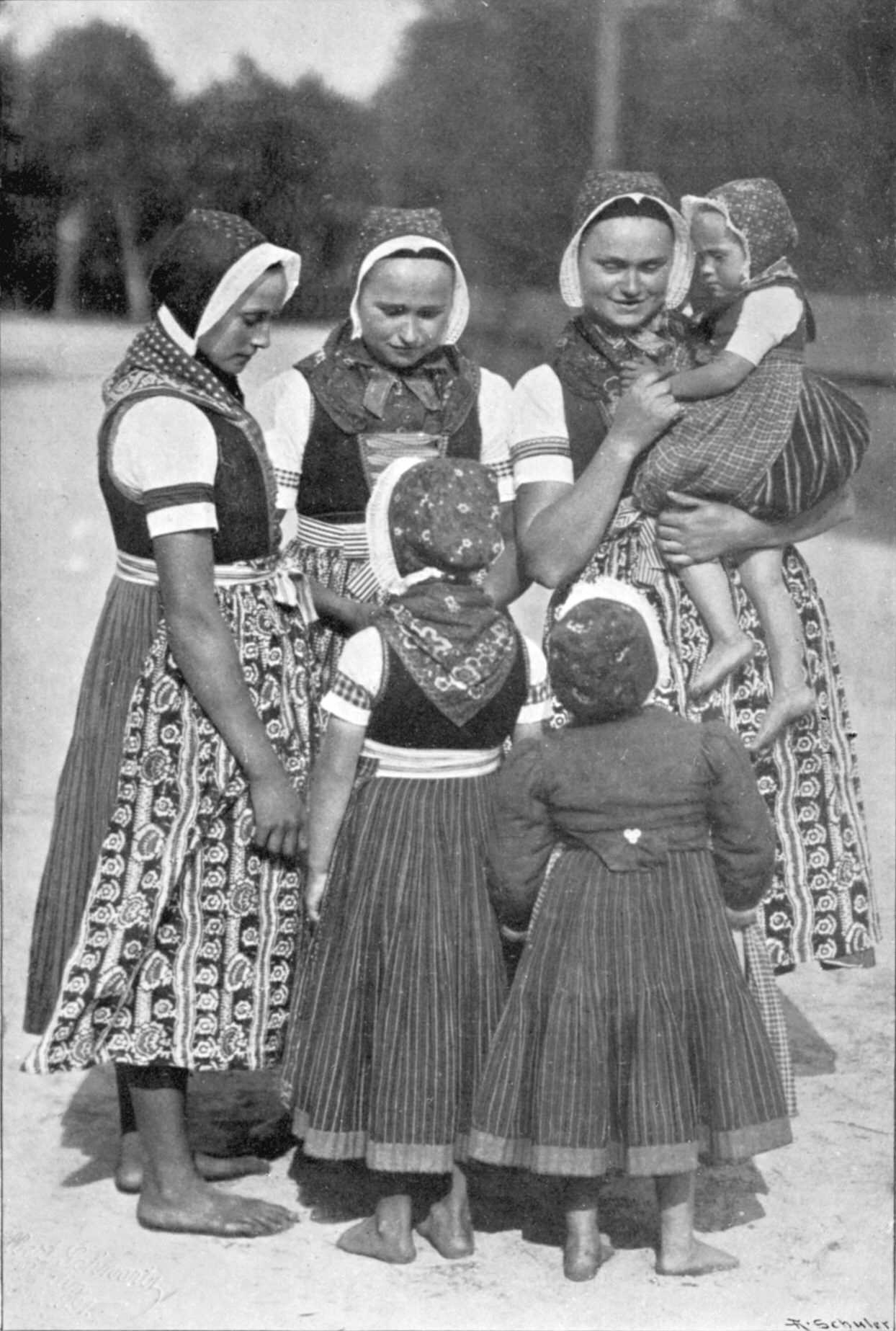
Sorbian women and children in the Schleife dress (1900)

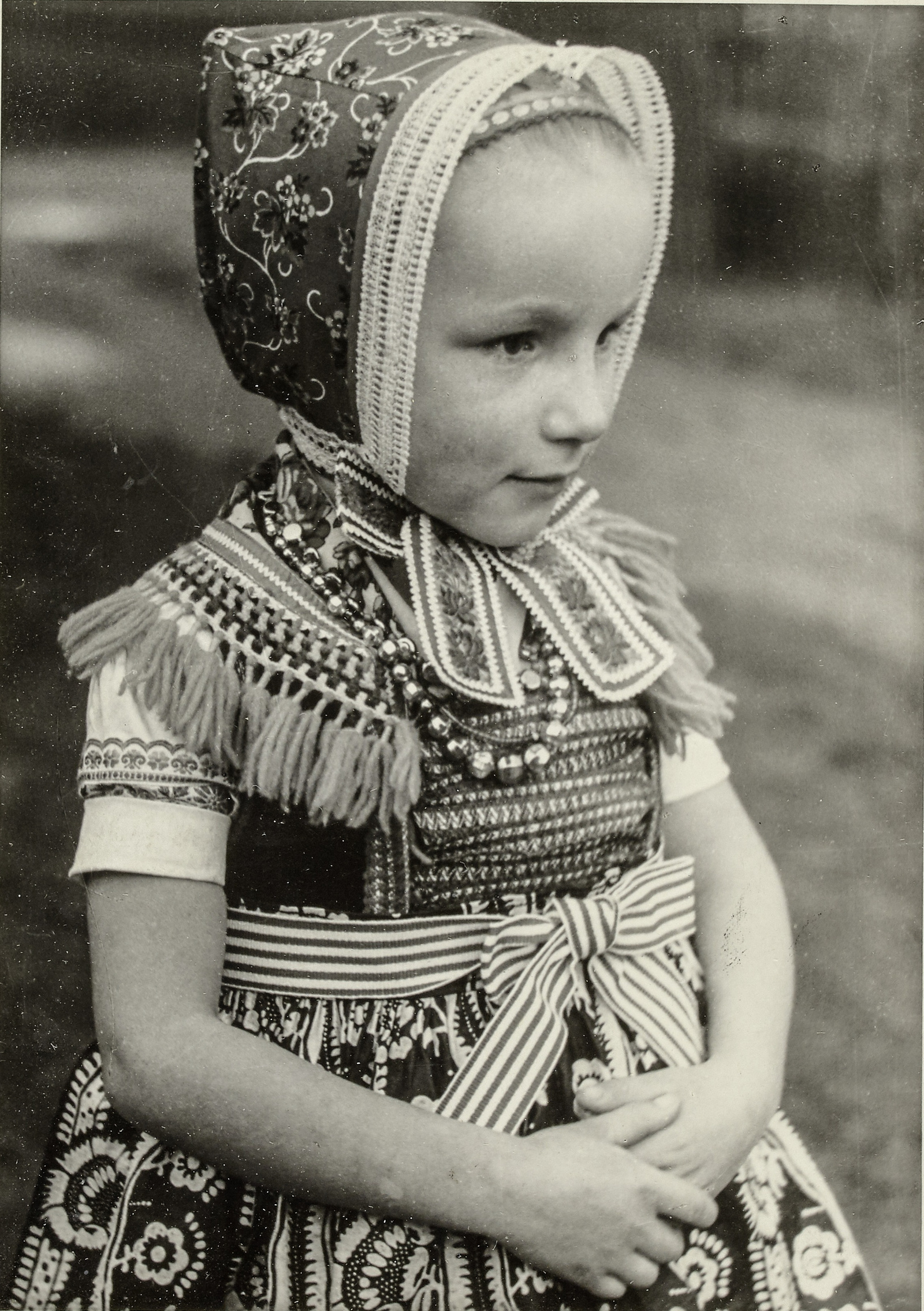
Little girl with Schleife dress

Schleife lies within the Sorbian habitat and marks the centre of the Schleifer dialect (Schleifer Dialekt) the small transitional dialect of the Upper Sorbian and Lower Sorbian languages. It is used in Schleife and the surrounding seven villages of the parish of Schleife (Schleifer Kirchspiel). Today it is only used by a small fraction of its inhabitants but there are efforts to reestablish it as a second mother tongue. The language is taught in one of the kindergartens (Witaj project) and in local school.

Old Slavic traditions and festivals are celebrated - by individuals and by groups and organizations like the Sorbisches Folkloreensemble Schleife.

In the municipality, there is a museum of the Sorbs.

== Education ==
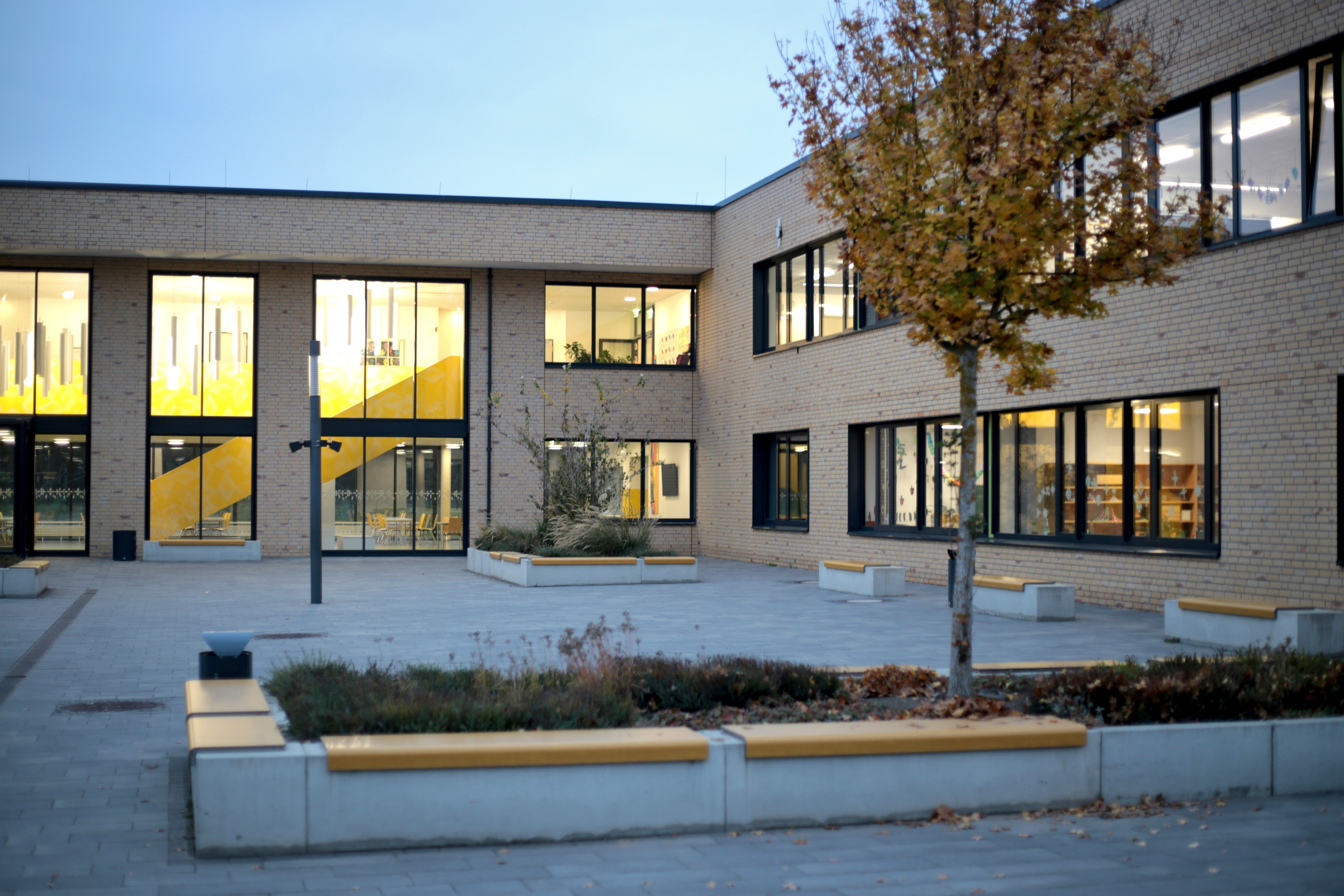
German–Sorbian School Complex in Schleife

The Witaj kindergarten in Rohne, together with the Dr. Marja Grollmus Primary and Secondary Schools, offers instruction in Sorbian alongside the standard curriculum prescribed by the State of Saxony. Both schools are housed in the modern German–Sorbian School Complex on Spremberger Straße. The complex also contains the Schleife Municipal Library.

Within the former Administrative Training School complex, the first Civilian Service Training School (Zivildienstschule) in the new federal states of reunified Germany was established in 1992.

As the only civilian service school in Saxony, it provided one- to two-week courses in political education for civilian service participants until June 2011, when compulsory civilian service ended.

== Transportation ==
Schleife is served by a railway station on the Berlin–Görlitz railway line. The station is served by Regionalbahn (RB) Line 65, operated by the Ostdeutsche Eisenbahn (ODEG).

The Federal Highway B156 runs north of the municipality. A proposed northern route for Federal Highway B160, which would have crossed the municipal area, was rejected by a majority of the local municipal council.

== Notable Natives ==
- Kito Lorenc: Sorbian-German writer, lyric poet and translator.
