= Arnošt Muka =

German-Sorbian writer and linguist

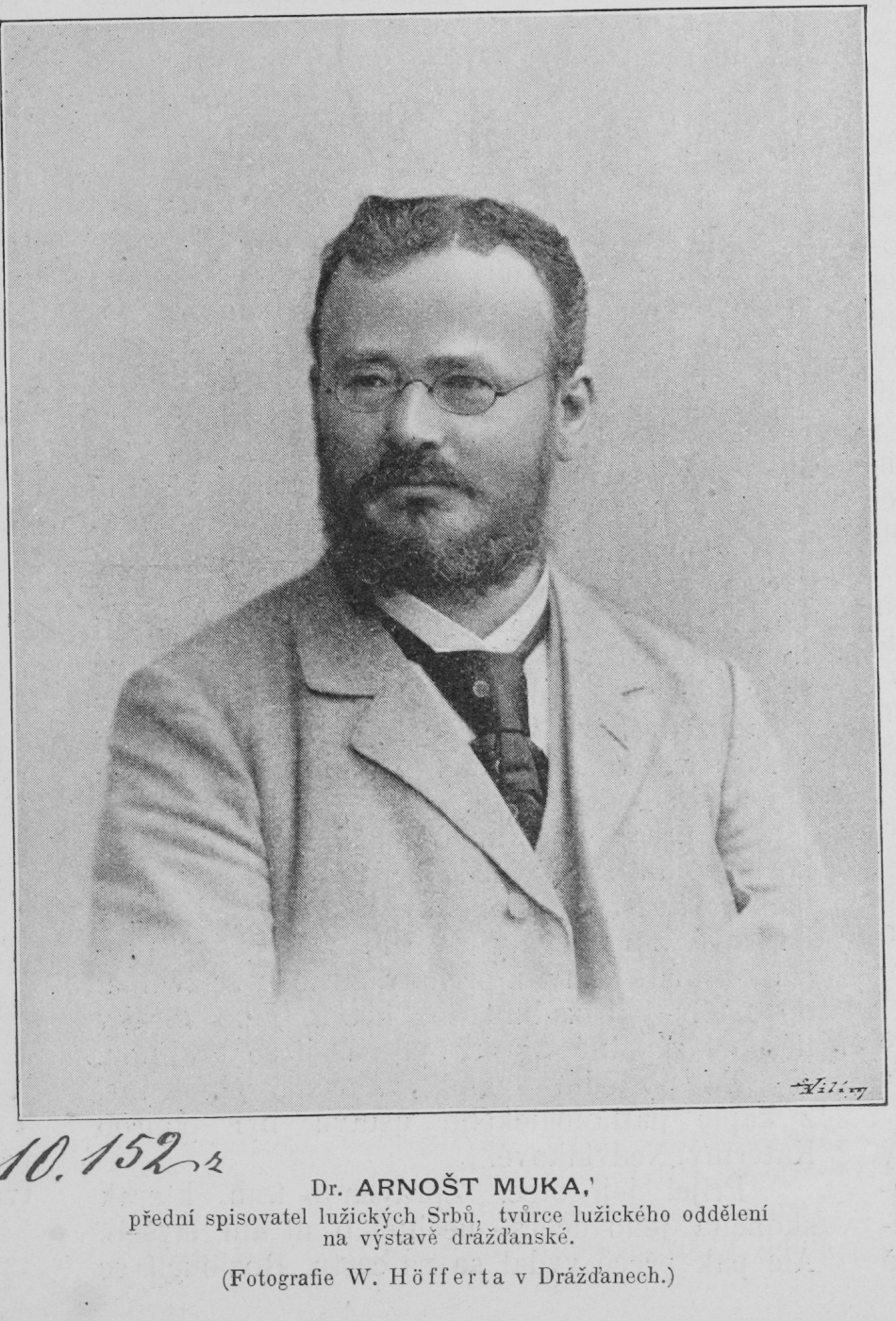
Arnošt Muka (1896)

Arnošt Muka (German: Ernst Mucke; 10 March 1854 – 10 October 1932) was a German and Sorbian writer, linguist and man of science.

Muka was born in Großhänchen which is now in the municipality of Burkau, and studied theology, classical languages and Slavonic in Leipzig. Because of his activities in connection with the Sorbian languages, he was sent to teach in a gymnasium in Chemnitz in 1883, and later to Freiberg. In 1917, he moved back to Bautzen, where he died on 10 October 1932.

== Books ==
- De dialectis Stesichori, Ibyci, Simonidis, Bacchylidis aliorumque poetarum choricorum cum Pindarica comparatis. disertacija, uniwersita Lipsk, 1879
- Statistika łužiskich Serbow. sebjenakładnistwo, Budyšin 1884–1886; 5. nakładow mjazy nadpismom Serbski zemjepisny słowničk. Budyšinje 1927; nowy śišć: Domowina-nakładnistwo, Budyšyn 1979
- Historische und vergleichende Laut- und Formenlehre der niedersorbischen (niederlausitzisch-wendischen) Sprache. Mit besonderer Berücksichtigung der Grenzdialecte und des Obersorbischen. Hirzel, Lipsk 1891; zasejwuśišć: centralny antikwariat nimskeje demokratiskeje republiki, Lipsk 1965
- Wörterbuch der nieder-wendischen Sprache und ihrer Dialekte.
- zwězk 1: A–N. nakładnistwo ruškeje a češkeje akademije wědomnosćow, St. Petersburg 1911–1915, Prag 1926; nowy śišć: Domowina-nakładnistwo, Budyšyn 2008, ISBN 978-3-7420-2091-8
- zwězk 2: O–Ź. nakładnistwo českeje akademije za wědomnosću a wuměłstwo, Prag 1928; nowy śišć: Domowina-nakładnistwo, Budyšin 2008, ISBN 978-3-7420-2092-5
- zwězk 3: Familiennamen, Ortsnamen, Flurnamen, Nachträge. nakładnistwo českeje akademije za wědomnosću a wuměłstwo, Prag 1928; nowy śišć: Domowina-nakładnistwo, Budyšyn 2008, ISBN 978-3-7420-2093-2
- Bausteine zur Heimatkunde des Luckauer Kreises. wokrejsne wuzamknjenje, Łukow 1918
- Serbsko-němski a němsko-serbski Přiručny-Słownik. Schmaler, Budyšin 1920
- Ernst Eichler (wudawaŕ): Abhandlungen und Beiträge zur sorbischen Namenkunde (1881–1929) (=slawistiske slěźenja, zwězk 45). Böhlau, Köln und Wien 1984, ISBN 3-412-08483-2
