= Johann Wilhelm Ridler =

Author and historian (1772–1834)

- Born: 12 April 1772; Leitmeritz, Bohemia, Holy Roman Empire
- Died: 23 January 1834; Vienna, Austrian Empire
- Education: Universitas Carolina, Prague; University of Vienna
- Occupations: University Librarian; Home tutor University Professor; Historian; Tutor at the Imperial Court
- Parent: Jacob Hilarius Ridler

Johann Wilhelm Ridler (12 April 1772 - 23 January 1834) was an author, historian and university professor. For the final twenty years of his life he was head librarian at the Vienna University Library.

== Biography ==
Johann Wilhelm Ridler was born at Leitmeritz (as Litoměřice was known before) 1945), a small predominantly catholic town in northern Bohemia. Jacob Hilarius Ridler, his father, was a businessman who had served in the imperial army during the time of Maria Theresa, ending up as an officer. His mother came from the minority Protestant community. Johann Wilhelm was the youngest of his parents' children.

Sources report that his love of literature was awakened not at the local Gymnasium (secondary school) which he attended, and where the quality of the teaching left much to be desired, but by Friedrich Klopstock's "Messias" (epic poem), which his parents used to read aloud to him at home. In 1787 he moved to Prague where he enrolled at the (then German speaking) Universitas Carolina ("Charles University"), embarking on a Philosophy degree course, and in the process making up for any residual deficiencies from his secondary school education. His teachers at Prague included the Jesuit-historian (and prominent freemason), Ignaz Cornova, the literary scholar (and pioneer of detective fiction, and another freemason) August Gottlieb Meißner and the theologian Karl Heinrich Seibt. These three stirred in Ridler an appetite for academic work and especially for historical research. He would continue a correspondence friendship with Cornova long after he had embarked on an independent teaching career of his own. In the meantime, he switched to the study of Jurisprudence in order to prepare himself for possible government service later on. He had already made a start on Natural Law and Church Law when, in 1791, his career changed direction. That year, through the mediations of his teachers at Prague, he took a position as a home tutor with a family in Vienna. His pedagogic duties left him with sufficient time to pursue his own education privately, now in the imperial capital.

In 1795, still as a home tutor, he moved to another family: he now worked for the family of Baron Franz Wilhelm von Natorp (1729–1802), variously described as a pharmacist, a wholesale trader or a wealthy businessman. Von Natorp had a lucrative contract for providing pharmaceutical supplies to the Austrian military. Ridler was able to combine his household tutoring with his own studies, now at the University of Vienna, where he attended the classes given by Franz Hammer on classical literature. Through the mediation of Hammer he also obtained a sub-professorship at the university in "World and Austrian political history" (eine "Lehrkanzeln der Welt- und österreichischen Staatengeschichte"). This became a full university professorship in 1804. At around the same time the Jesuit and Greek scholar, Prof. Franz Alter, retired and almost immediately died. Ridler took over Alter's responsibility in respect of Diplomatics (the specialist study of historical documents) and Heraldry. His relative youth and slightly unusual career path to date were not well received by students who initially boycotted his classes, but Ridler stood his ground. One of the students, induced by a fee waiver, attended a lecture: the others soon followed, with no further signs of generalised displeasure.

Vienna fell under French military occupation in November 1805. The invasion was unopposed and on this occasion brief: many Viennese seem to have viewed the French soldiers as much with bemused curiosity as with hostility. At the university Johann Wilhelm Ridler continued to deliver his lectures during these weeks. Despite awareness that his audiences now included French officers who, on account of their Alsatian provenance, understood every word, he did not hold back from including in his discourses patriotic sentiments, drawing attention to those aspects of the contemporary situation that displeased him.

In 1807 Ridler accepted an appointment as educator to Archduke Franz Karl, the emperor's third son. His duties in reality also included tutoring Franz Karl's elder brother, the Archduke (and future emperor) Ferdinand and (very briefly) the Archduke Joseph (who died of yellow fever or small pox later that same year). In addition to the three archdukes, Ridler served as educator to their three sisters, the Archduchesses Marie Louise (who later married Napoleon Buonaparte), Leopoldina and Carolina.

After two years he resigned his position as court educator when he was appointed a "Regierungsrathe" (loosely, "governing councillor" and to membership of the "Studien-Hofcommission" (loosely, "Education [court] commission"), on which he would serve for the next seven years. Then in 1814, following the death of Court-councillor Anton Spendou the previous year, Johann Wilhelm Ridler accepted an invitation to succeed him as head of the Vienna University Library. He was relatively young for such an appointment, and it was clear from the start that this was to be no sinecure. He reduced his teaching work at the university to a bare minimum. After nearly two decades of the French Revolutionary Wars there was an urgent need to make the library more relevant to the needs of scientists and scholars, and to make the already large and high grade book collection more usable. Under Ridler's direction the collection grew significantly - by approximately 30,000 volumes in 20 years, and there was a significant increase in the library's endowment income, amounting to an additional 2,000 florins annually. The reading rooms were completely reconfigured in order to improve access to the books. The work accomplished is described in careful detail in the library archives for 1830, published on 12 February and edited by Ridler himself.

Ridler's final years were blighted by serious illness, from which he eventually died, aged 62 in Vienna, which is where his body was buried.
