= Raue =

Raue is a surname. Notable people with the surname include:

- Alexander Raue (born 1973), German politician
- Arne Raue (born 1970), German politician
- Brigitte Raue, German rower
- Christian Raue (1613–1677), German orientalist and theologian
- Charles Gottlieb Raue (1820–1896), American homeopathic physician
- Tim Raue (born 1974), German chef
