= Seibt =

Seibt is a surname. Notable people with this surname include:

- Bastian Seibt (born 1978), former German rower
- Hellmut Seibt (1929-1992), Austrian figure skater
- Karl Heinrich Seibt (1735-1806), German theologian and teacher
- Kurt Seibt (1908-2002), German politician
- Naomi Seibt (born 2000), German political activist
- Sophie Seibt (1812-1889), German composer
