= Bautzen Reservoir =

Reservoir on the River Spree, Germany

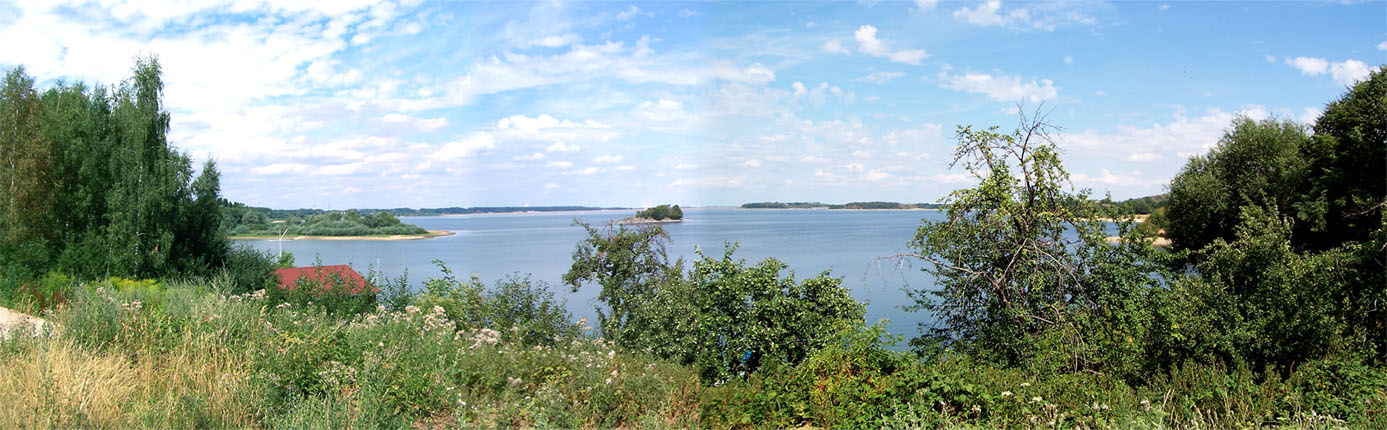
- The Bautzen Reservoir (2006)

- Location within Saxony
- Location: Saxony, Germany
- Coordinates: 51.213121°N 14.454575°E
- Type: Reservoir
- River sources: River Spree
- Built: 1977; 49 years ago

The Bautzen Reservoir, (German: 'Talsperre Bautzen') is a reservoir on the River Spree in Germany. It is situated just north of the city of Bautzen in the state of Saxony.

The dam was built from 1968 to 1975, and has been in operation since 1977.

The dam is used to provide domestic water supplies and to regulate water levels in order to conserve water and reduce flood risk. Importantly, it ensures a constant water supply to the Boxberg lignite-fuelled power station down stream on the River Spree and also provides for fishing and other water-based leisure activities.

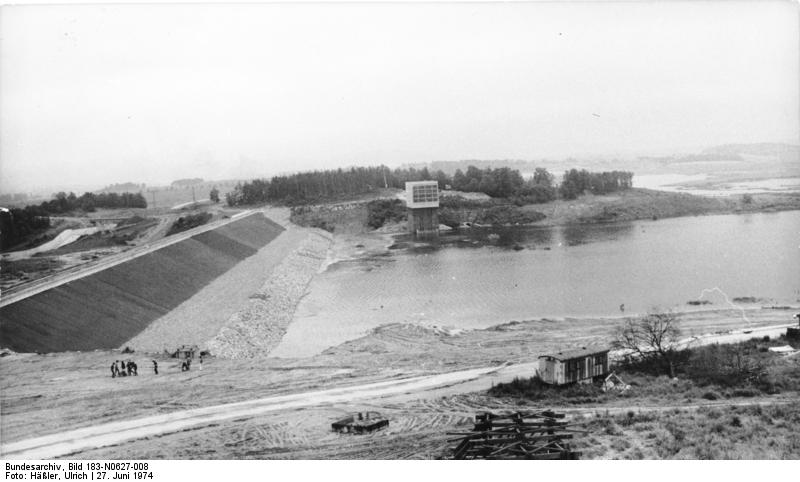
Test damming of the river, 1974

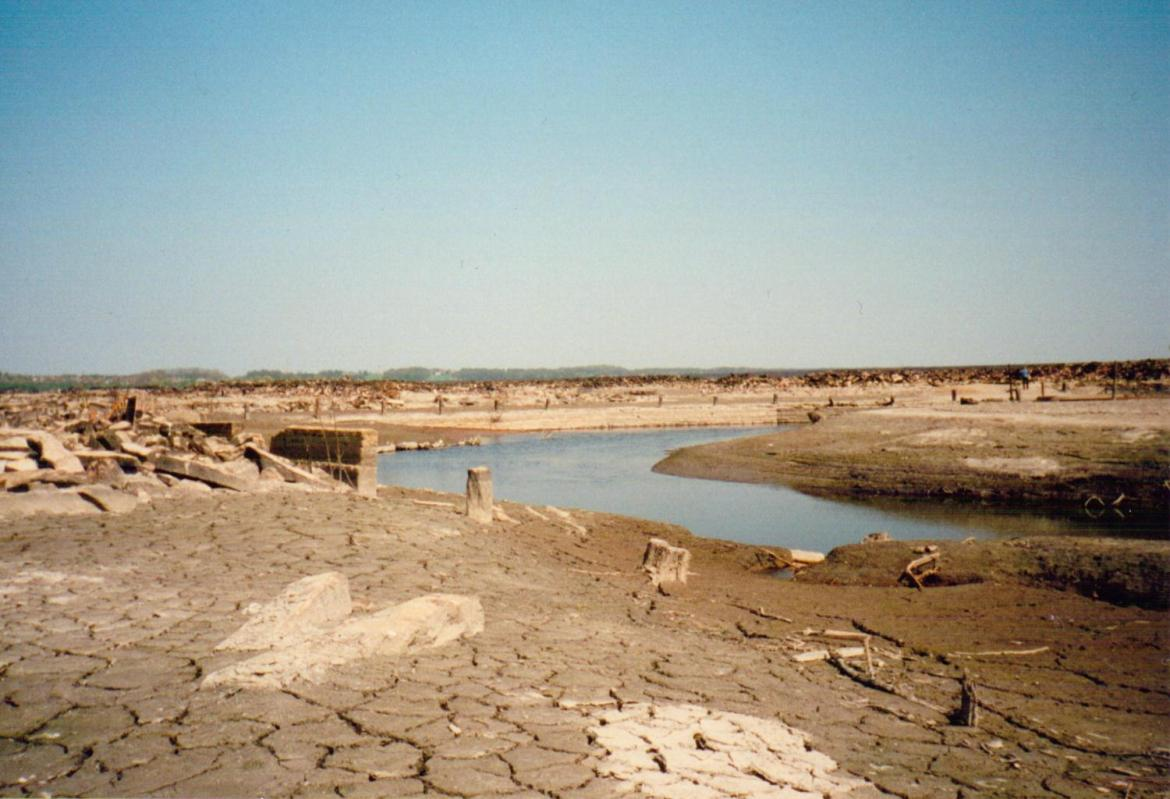
The old course of the Spree, 1997

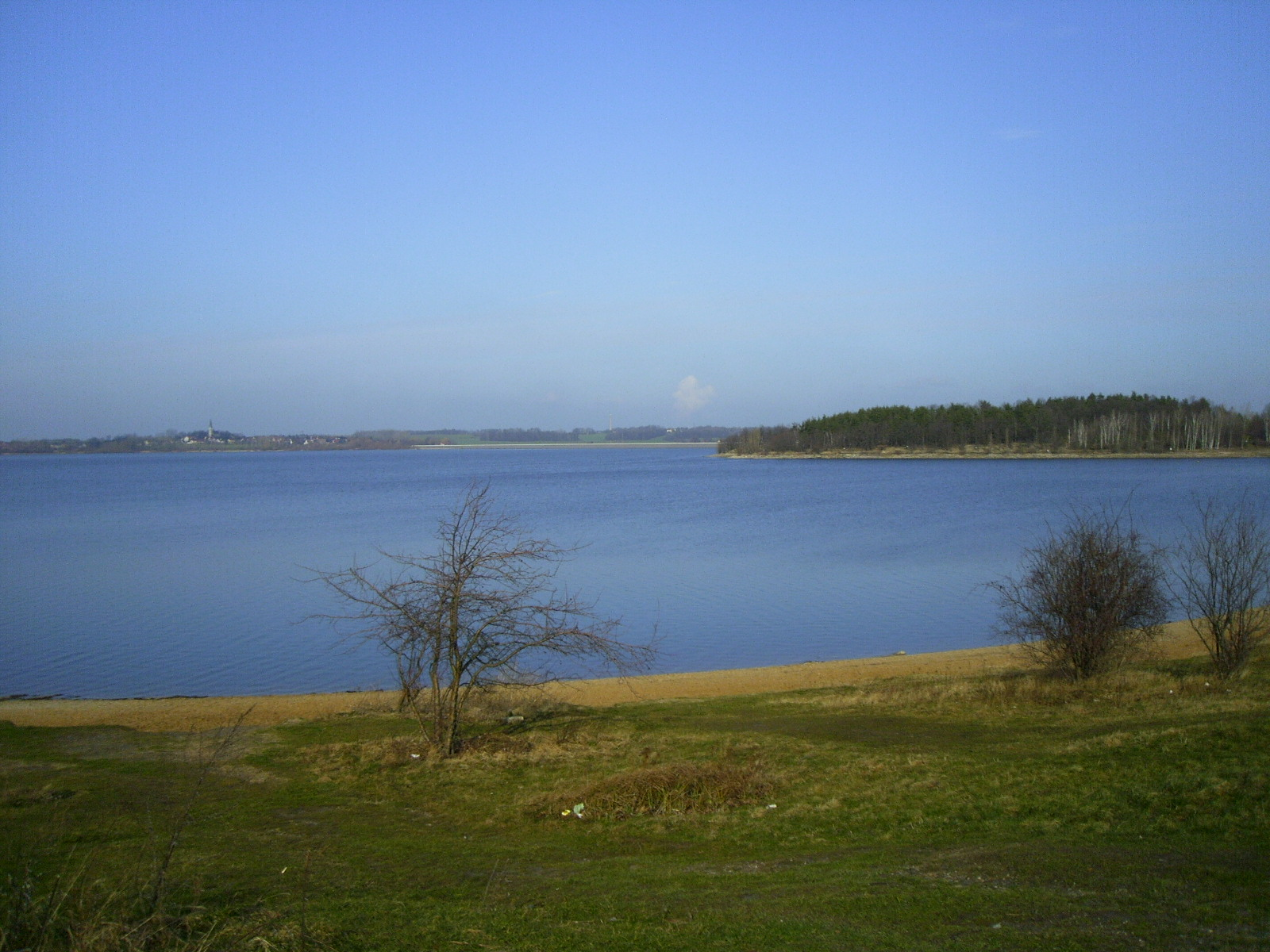
Reservoir with view of Quatitz

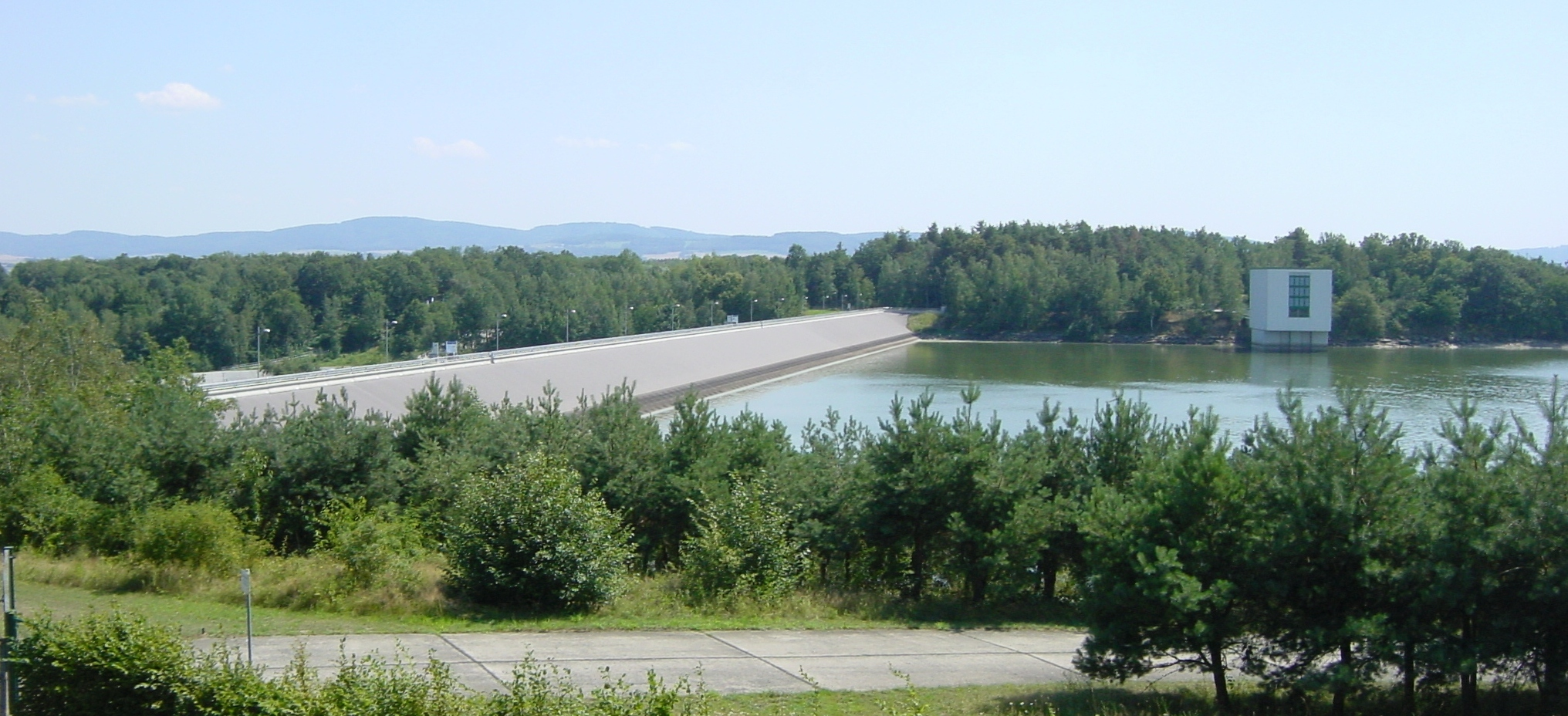
The dam holding back the reservoir

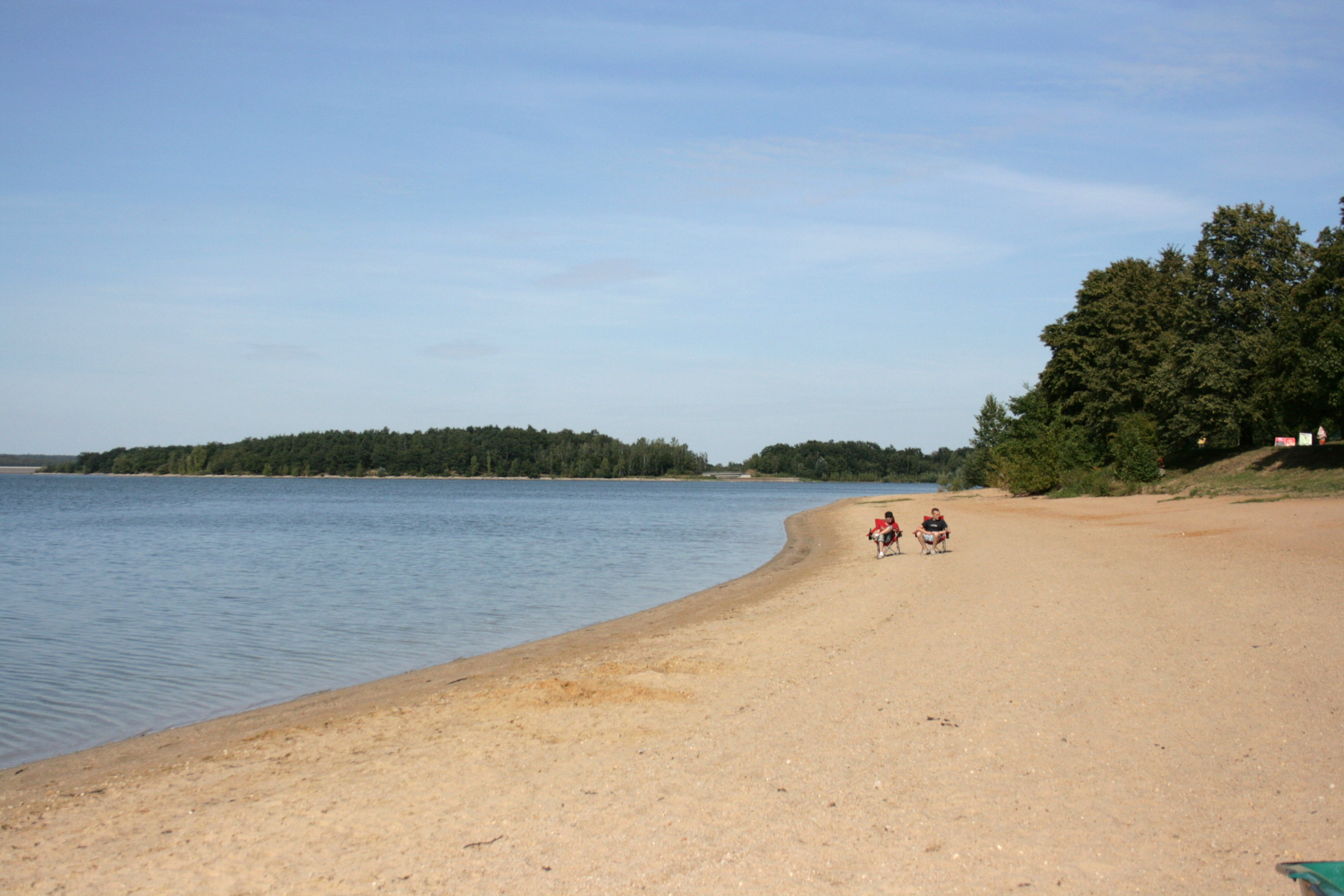
Beach in 2009

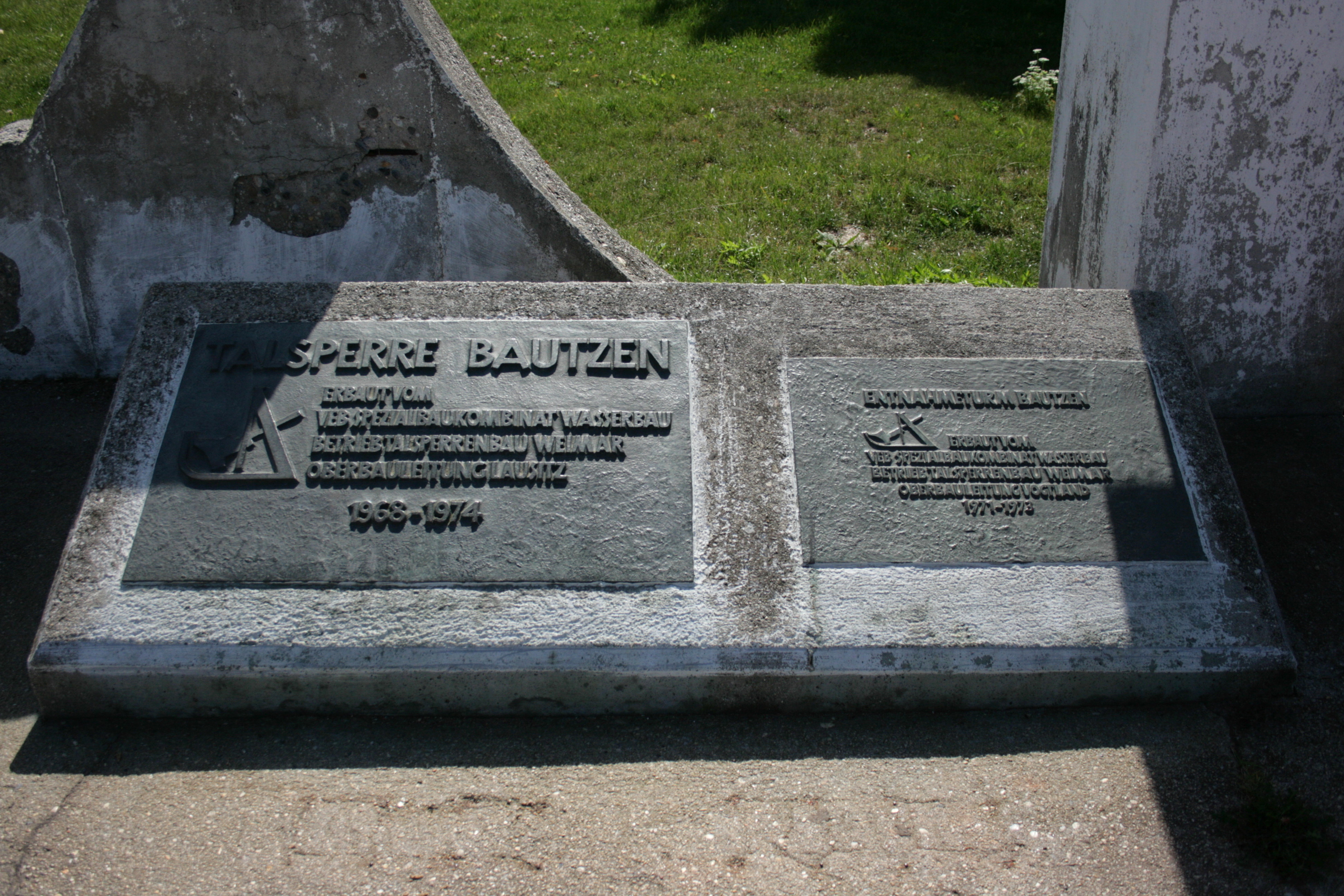
Memorial statue to the building of the dam
