= Siege of Bautzen (1620) =

Part of the Thirty Years' War

Capture of Bautzen
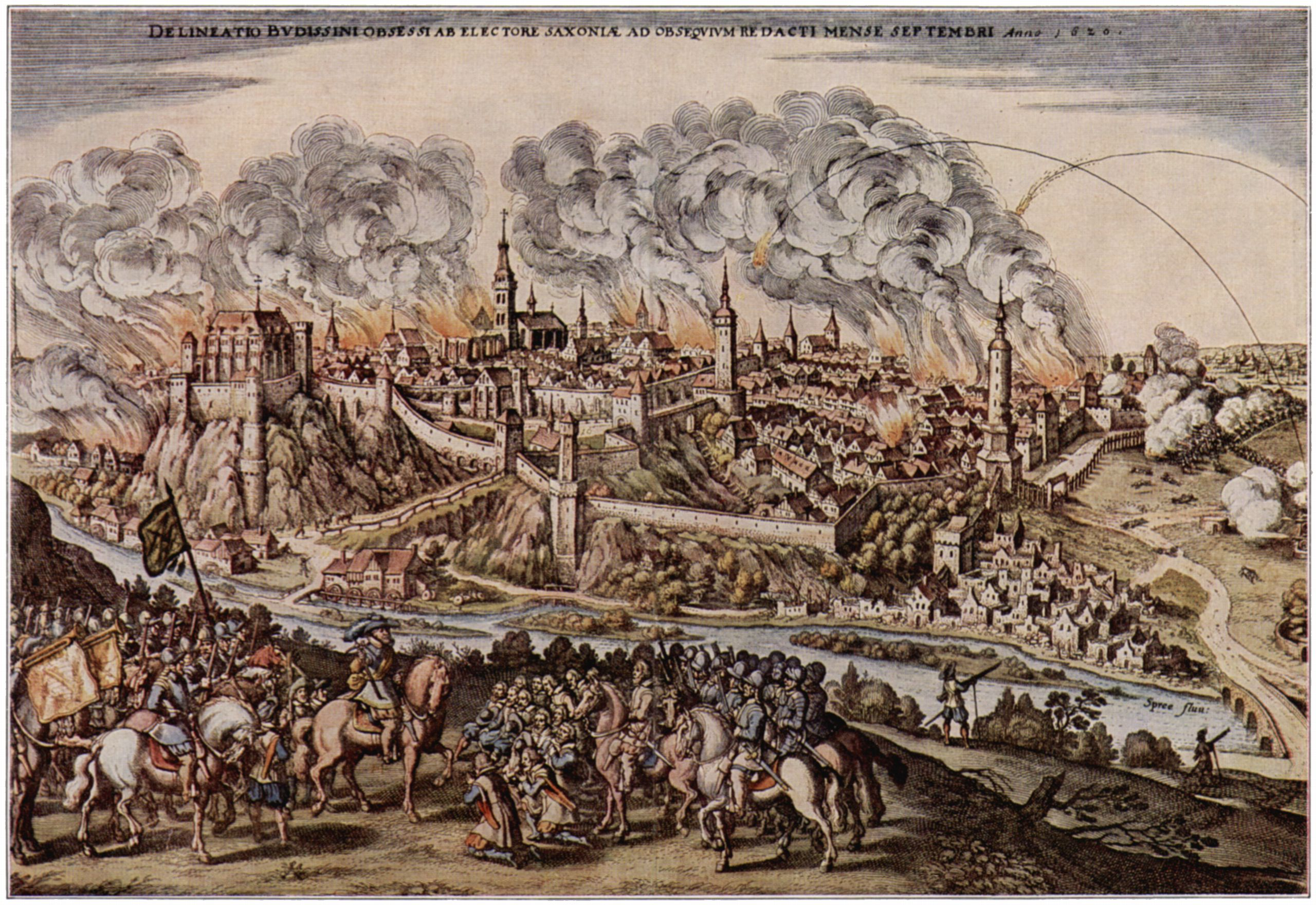
- The capture of Bautzen by Johann Georg
Date	5 October 1620
Location	Bautzen
Result	Saxon victory
Territorial changes	Bautzen is captured by the Saxons

Belligerents
(Electorate of Saxony) Saxony	(Kingdom of Bohemia) Bohemia

Commanders and leaders
(Electorate of Saxony) Johann Georg (Electorate of Saxony) Wolfgang von Mansfeld	(Kingdom of Bohemia) Johann Georg von Jägerndorf

Strength
8,300 men 3,000 militia	2,000 (mainly militia)

Casualties and losses
Light	Heavy

The Capture of Bautzen occurred in September 1620, during the later stages of the Bohemian Revolt, when the Saxons bombarded the fortress city of Bautzen. The capture was a major victory for the Saxons, and the Bohemians withdrew to their last fortress in Lusatia.

== Background ==
After the Bohemians were defeated at the Battle of Sablat, Saxony saw its chance to control Lusatia, a province it desired. The Saxons made an alliance with the Habsburgs, where they would invade Bohemia in return for Lusatia. In August 1620, Johann Georg invaded the region, and soon after most of Lusatia was overrun except for Bautzen and Görlitz. The Bohemian commander in the region was the Duke of Jägerndorf who only had 2,000 poorly trained militia. He soon went to Bautzen and began preparing defences. Bautzen was on Spree river, but had thin walls that were vulnerable to artillery.

== Bombardment ==
When the Saxons approached Bautzen, the Bohemians retreated into the city. The Saxons then began bombarding it, and its old walls crumbled under the cannonade, causing a fire to spread rapidly, and burning down large parts of Bautzen. After a few more days, the Bohemians abandoned the city, which the Saxons occupied the following day.

== Aftermath ==
After the capture, Jägerndorf retreated to Görlitz, where he held out until the defeat at White Mountain. After that, he fled to Silesia where he held out until he retreated south into Hungary, living there until his death.

== See also ==
- Bohemian Revolt

== work cited ==
- Wilson, Peter H. (2009). Europe's Tragedy: A History of the Thirty Years War. Allen Lane. ISBN 978-0-7139-9592-3.
- Richard Jecht: Der Oberlausitzer Hussitenkrieg und das Land der Sechsstädte unter Kaiser Sigmund. In: Neues Lausitzisches Magazin, 1. Teil, Band 87, Görlitz 1911, S. 35–279
- Richard Jecht: Der Oberlausitzer Hussitenkrieg und das Land der Sechsstädte unter Kaiser Sigmund. In: Ebda, 2. Teil, Band 90, Görlitz 1914, S. 31–151
- Lutz Mohr: Die Hussiten in der Oberlausitz unter besonderer Berücksichtigung ihrer Feldzüge in den Jahren von 1424 bis 1434. Sonderausgabe Nr. 2 der Reihe: Geschichte und Geschichten aus Neusalza-Spremberg, Greifswald u. Neusalza-Spremberg 2014.
