= Alfred Meissner =

Austrian poet

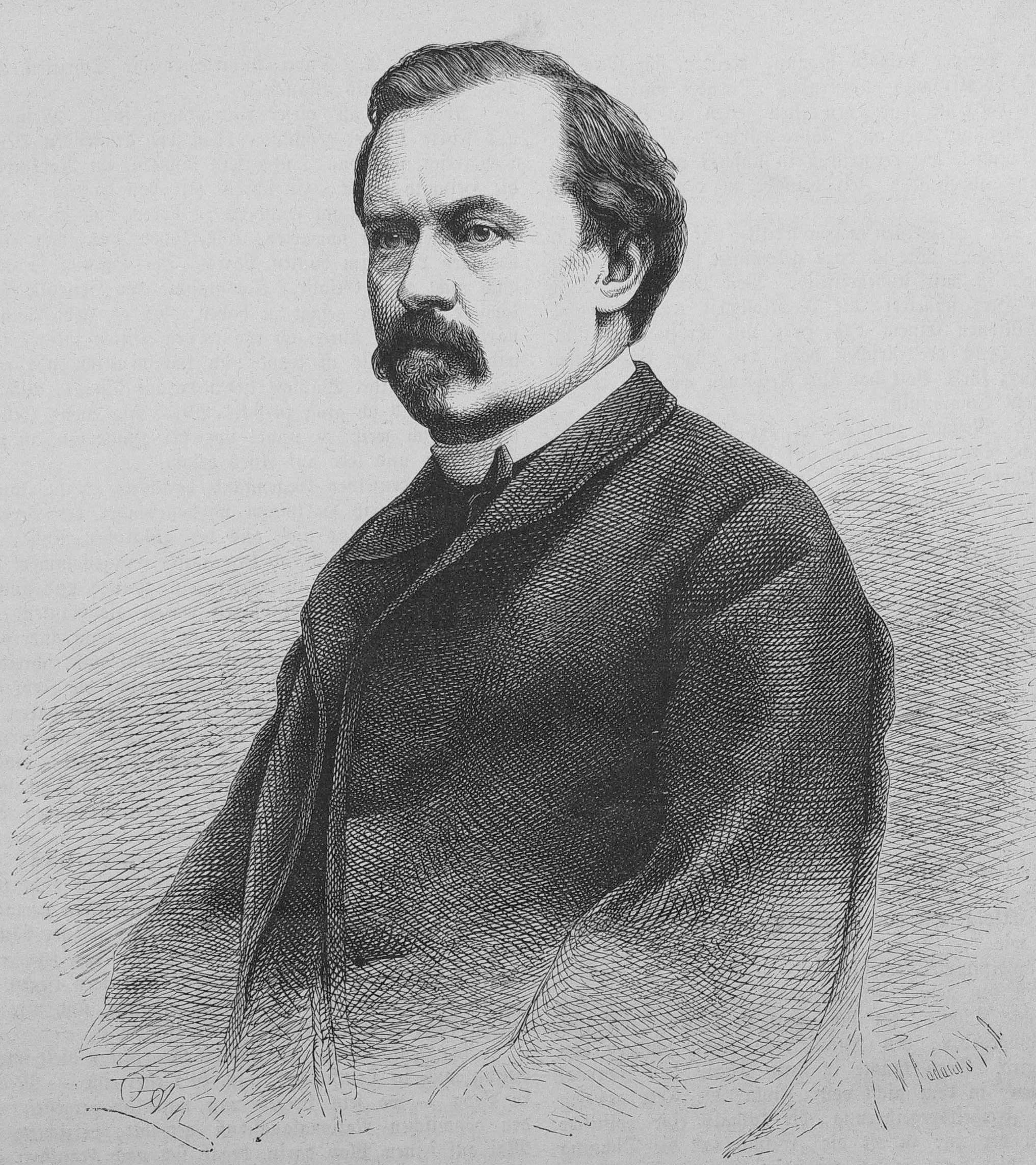
Portrait engraving of Meissner by Adolf Neumann, published in Die Gartenlaube, 1867

Alfred Meissner (15 October 1821, Teplitz – 29 May 1885, Bregenz) was an Austrian poet.

== Biography ==
He is a grandson of the voluminous miscellaneous author August Gottlieb Meissner (1753-1807). He studied medicine, taking his degree at Prague in 1846. To elude the Austrian censorship, he published in the same year at Leipzig his epic poem Ziska (10th ed., 1867). He long resided chiefly in Paris, and returned to Prague in 1850, where he and Moritz Hartmann were the principal representatives of the liberal school of German poetry in Bohemia, a 10th edition of his Gedichte appearing in 1867.

== Works ==
Some of his works, especially Der Sohn des Atta Troll (1850), abound with the peculiar sarcasm and pathos in which Heinrich Heine excelled, and he published Erinnerungen an Heine (1854). Among his novels are Zwischen Fürst und Volk (Between prince and people, 3 vols., 2d ed., 1861), illustrating the revolutions of 1848; Zur Ehre Gottes (To the honor of God, 2 vols., 1861); and Schwarzgelb (8 vols., Berlin, 1864; popular edition, 1 vol., 1866). His other writings include Charaktermasken (3 vols., Leipzig, 1861–63); Novellen (2 vols., Leipzig, 1864); Die Kinder Rom's (Children of Rome, 4 vols., Berlin, 1870); and Rococo-Bilder (Gumbinnen, 1871).
