= Bautzen =

Bautzen Budyšin
- Town
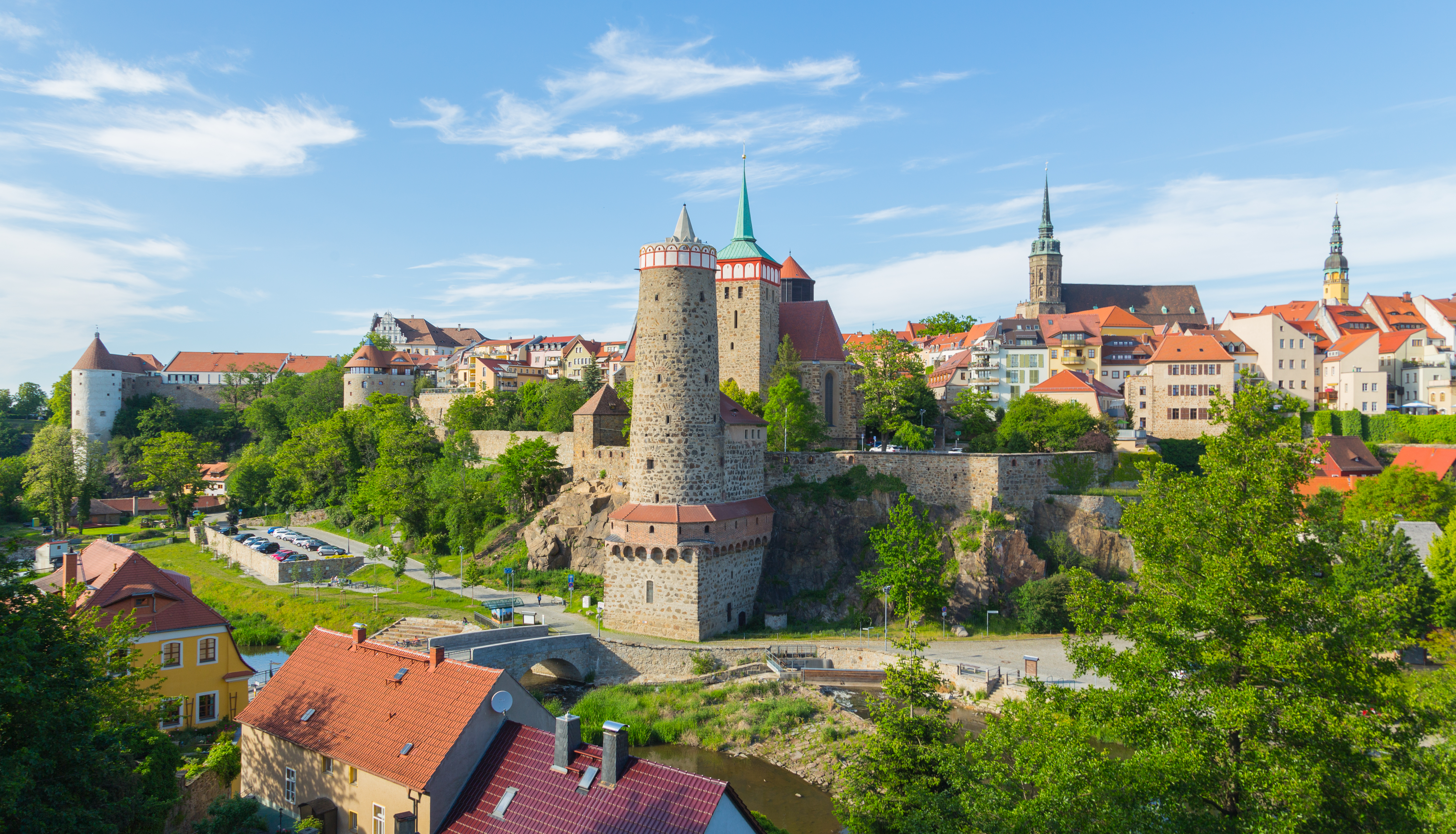
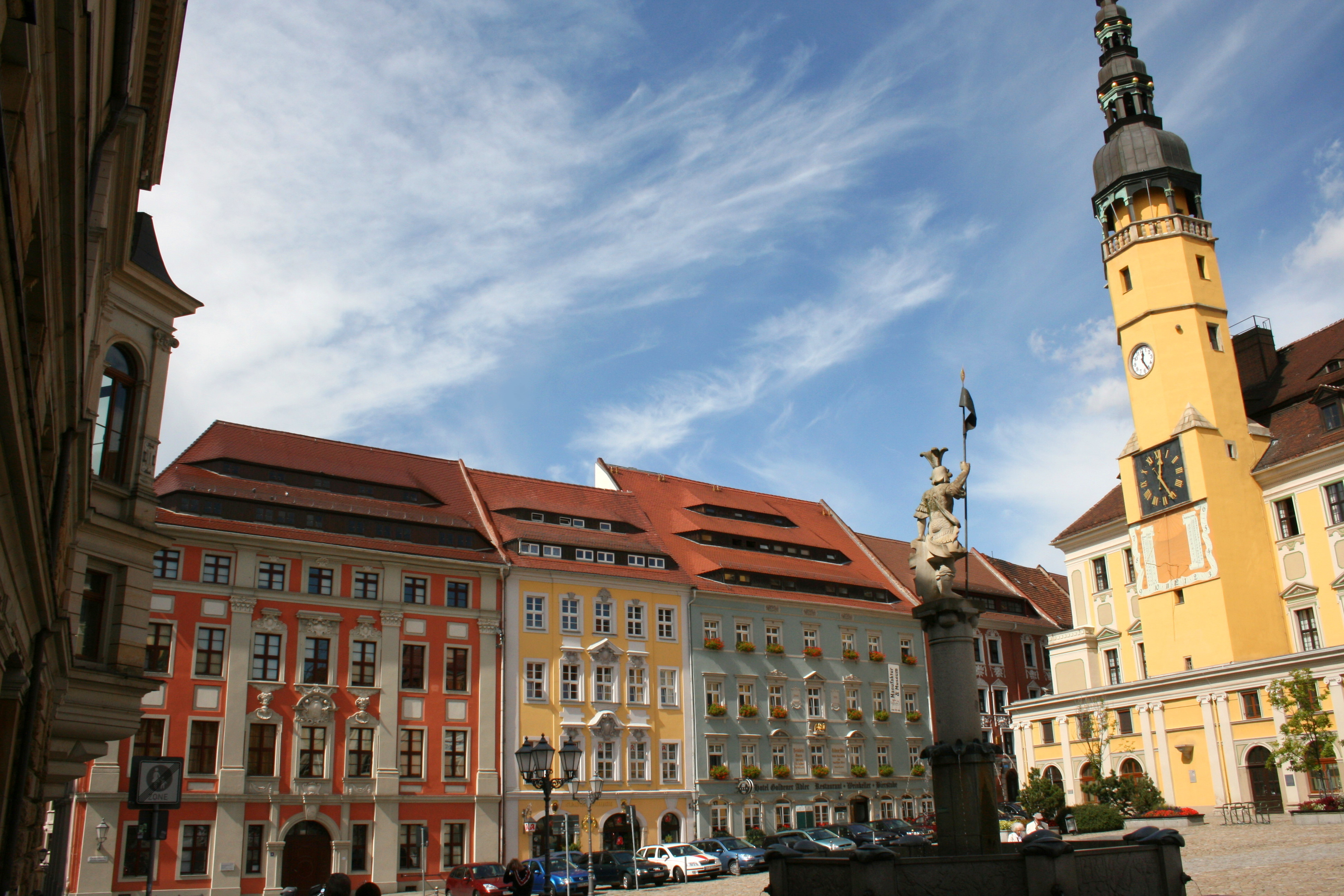
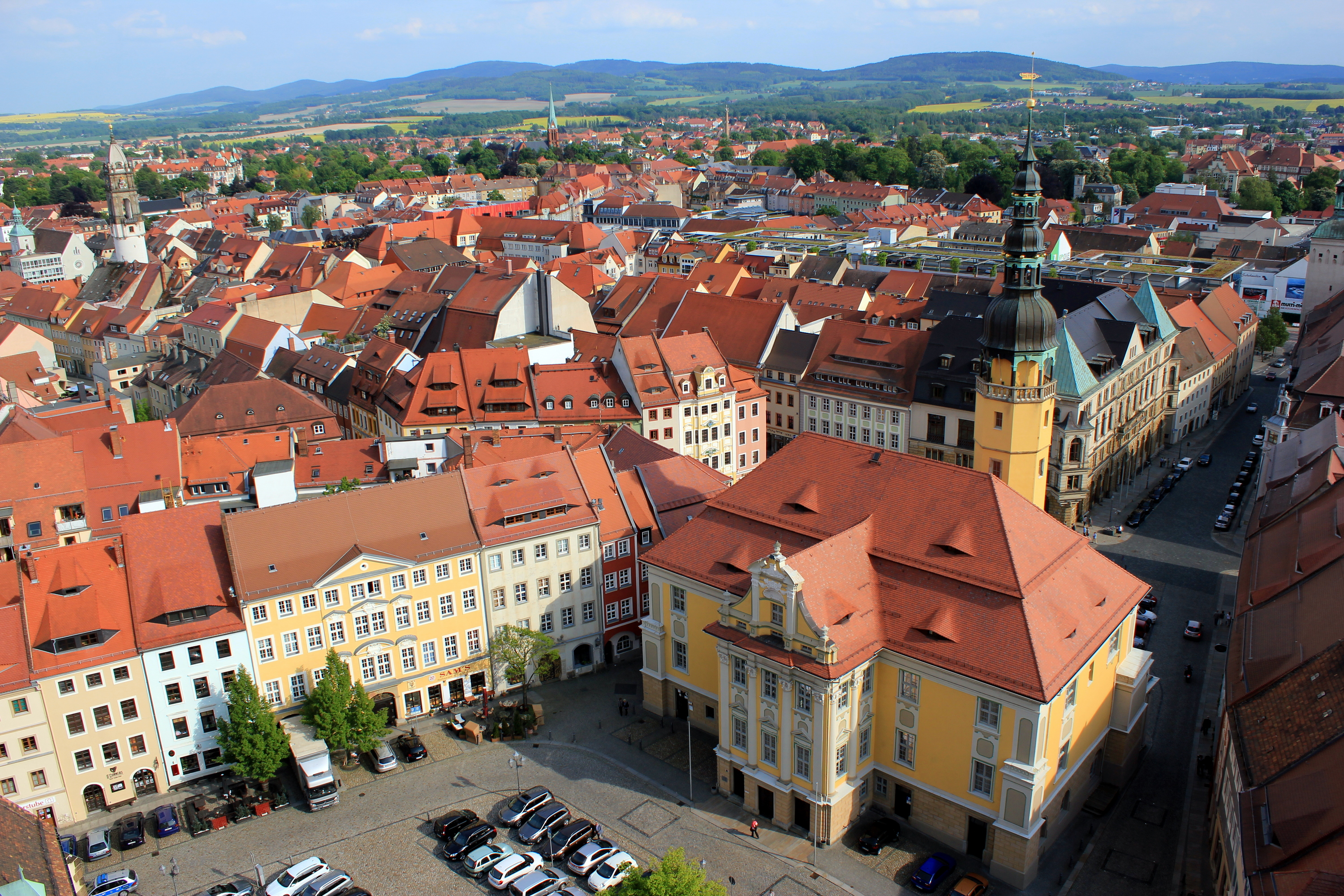
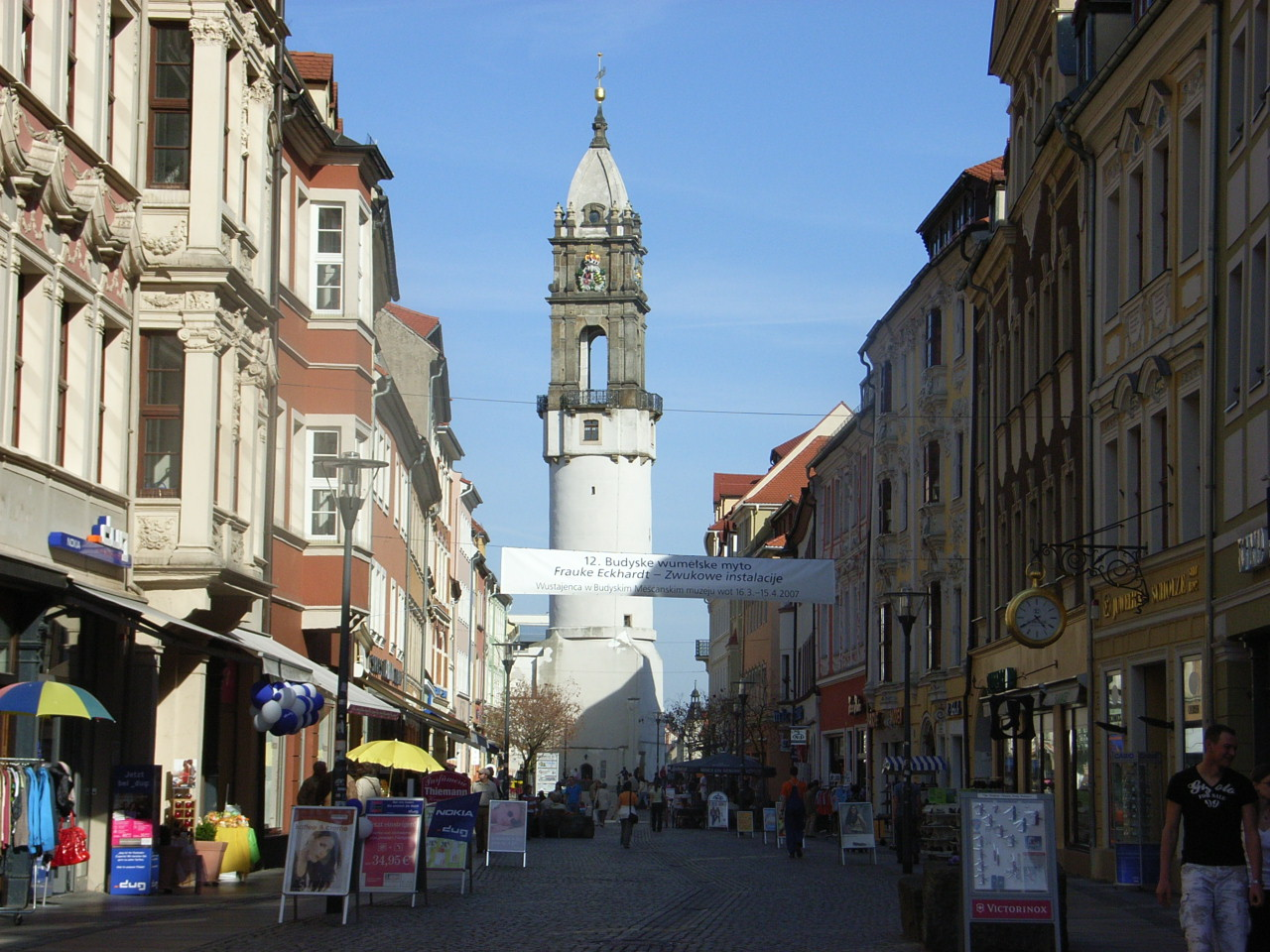
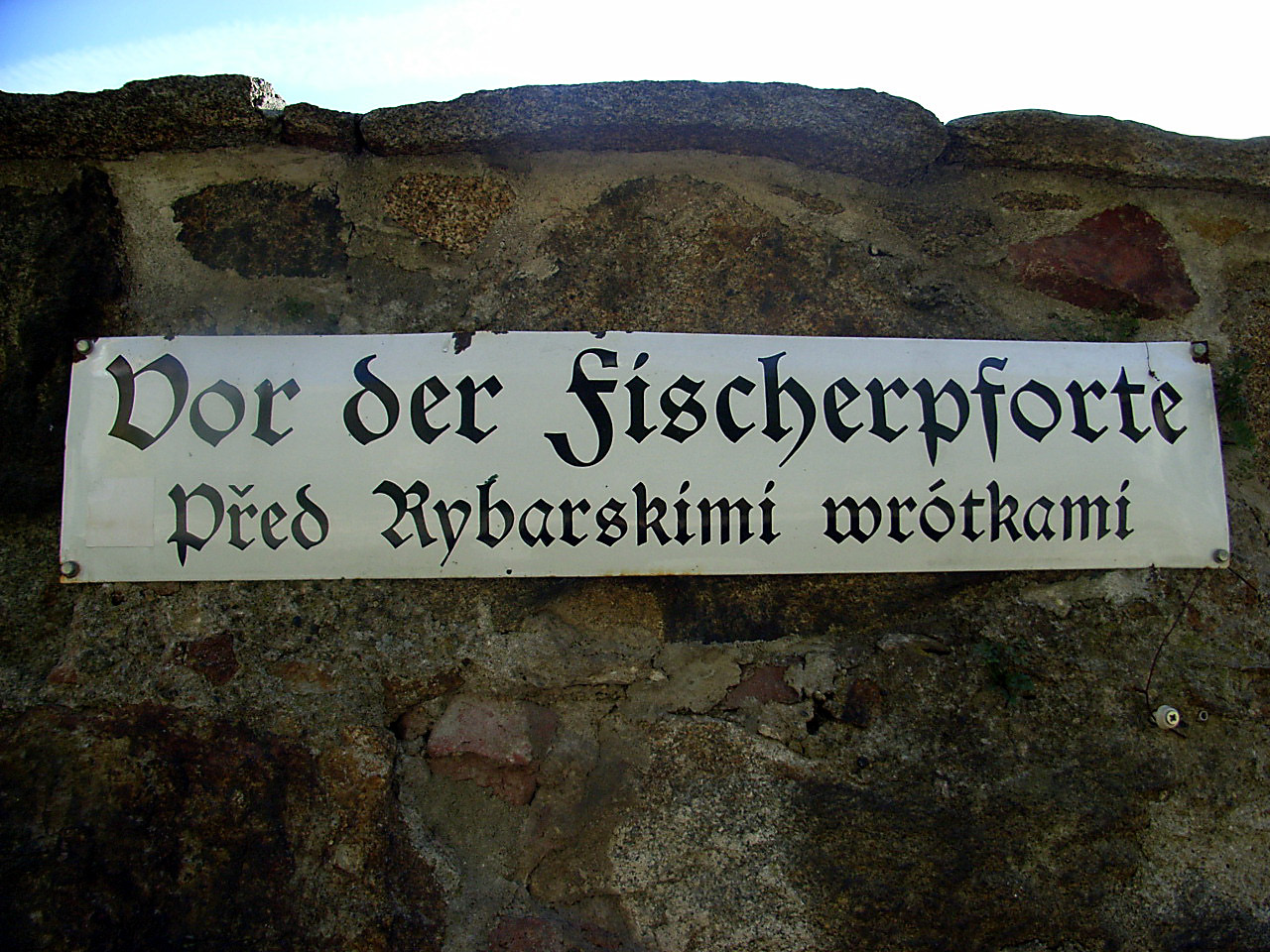
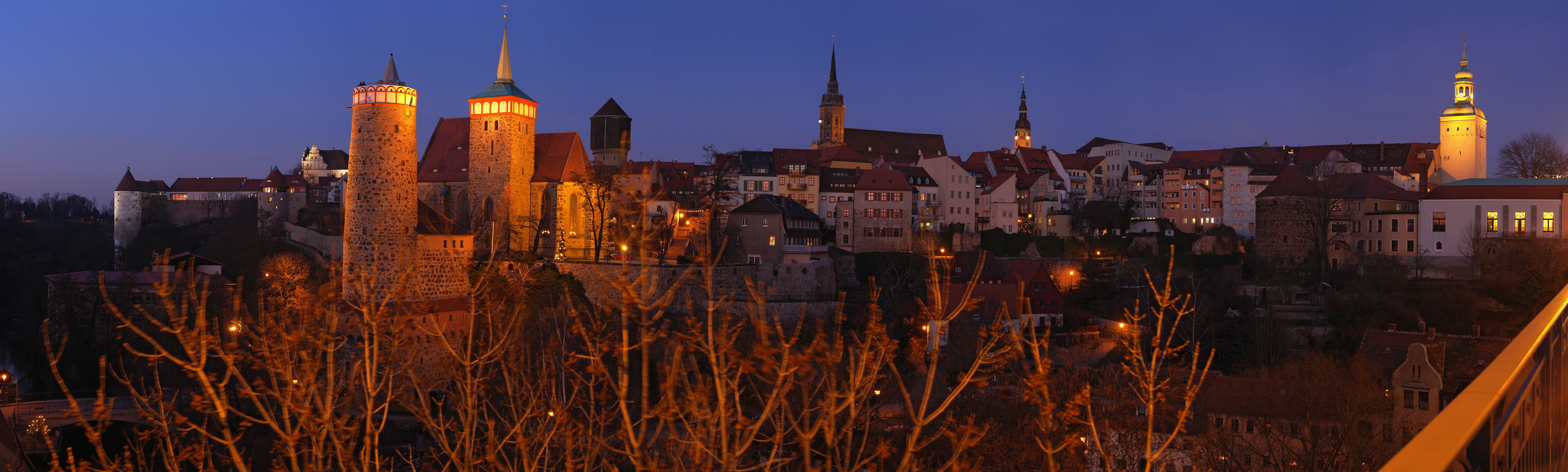
- Clockwise from top: view of Bautzen, view over the city hall to the Czorneboh (Lusatian Highlands), historicizing bilingual Bautzen street signage, view of the city at dusk, Reichenturm, Main Market Square with town hall

- Coat of arms

- Location of Bautzen within Bautzen district
- Interactive map of Bautzen
- Location within Germany Location within Saxony
- Coordinates: 51°10′53″N 14°25′27″E
- Country: Germany
- State: Saxony
- District: Bautzen
- Subdivisions: 15

Government
  - Mayor (2022–29): Karsten Vogt (CDU)

Area
  - Total: 66.67 km^{2} (25.74 sq mi)
- Elevation: 204 m (669 ft)

Population (2025-12-31)
  - Total: 37,306
  - Density: 559.6/km^{2} (1,449/sq mi)
- Demonym(s): German: Bautzener; Upper Sorbian: Budyšan (m.), Budyšanka (f.)
- Time zone: UTC+01:00 (CET)
  - Summer (DST): UTC+02:00 (CEST)
- Postal codes: 02625
- Dialling codes: 03591
- Vehicle registration: BZ, BIW, HY, KM
- Website: bautzen.de

Bautzen (German pronunciation: [ˈbaʊtsn̩]) or Budyšin (Upper Sorbian pronunciation: [ˈbudɨʃin]), until 1868 Budissin in German, is a town in eastern Saxony, Germany, and the administrative centre of the district of Bautzen. It is located on the Spree river, is the eighth most populous town in Saxony, and is the seat of Saxony's largest district. Bautzen lies in the bilingual Sorbian settlement area of Lusatia, and is Lusatia's third-largest town after Cottbus and Görlitz, as well as the second-largest town in Upper Lusatia.

The town lies in the hilly Upper Lusatian Gefilde, a part of the northwesternmost foothills of the Sudetes, just north of the Lusatian Highlands. Bautzen is the first larger town on the Spree River, and the Bautzen Reservoir lies in the north of the town. In 2021, Bautzen had a population of around 38,000.

Although Görlitz is larger, it is Bautzen that is regarded as the historical capital of Upper Lusatia. Bautzen is the political and cultural center of the entirety of the Slavic minority of the Sorbs (Upper and Lower), although Lower Lusatia and the Lower Sorbian-speaking Sorbs have their own, second center, which is Cottbus. About 10 percent of Bautzen's population is Upper Sorbian-speaking. The use of the language is more widespread in the countryside surrounding the town than in the town itself. Bautzen is the seat of several Sorbian institutions like the Domowina, the German-Sorbian People's Theater (Němsko-Serbske ludowe dźiwadło), and Sorbian Broadcasting.

From 1346 until 1815, the town was a member of the Lusatian League. The Bautzen Wenceslaus' Market (Bautzener Wenzelsmarkt, Upper Sorbian: Budyske Wjacławske wiki) is "Germany's oldest Christmas market mentioned in a chronicle". Asteroid 11580 Bautzen is named in honour of the city.

== Names ==
Like other cities and places in Lusatia, Bautzen has several different names across languages. Its German name was also officially changed in 1868.

Besides Bautzen (German) and Budyšin (Upper Sorbian), the town has had the following names:

- German: Budissin (variants used from c. 11th century onwards; Saxon government changed to Bautzen on 3 June 1868)
- Lower Sorbian: Budyšyn [ˈbudɨʃɨn]
- Czech: Budyšín [ˈbudɪʃiːn]
- Polish: Budziszyn [buˈd͡ʑiʂɨn]

== Geography ==
=== Geographical situation ===
The town on the River Spree is situated about 50 km (31 mi) east of Dresden between the Lusatian highland and the lowlands in the north, amidst the region of Upper Lusatia. To the north stretches the Bautzen Reservoir, which was flooded in 1974. This is the former location of the villages of Malsitz (Małšecy) and Nimschütz (Hněwsecy).

=== Expansion of the urban area ===
The old part of Bautzen is located on the plateau above the Spree, whose top is marked by the Ortenburg castle. It is bordered by the city walls. The later-built more recent quarters in the east were enclosed by the city ramparts. After their removal, the city expanded further east and to the left bank of the river. However, there has only been a small urban area west of the Spree until today. In the 1970s, the development areas of "Gesundbrunnen" and "Allendeviertel" were erected. After 1990, several neighbouring villages were incorporated.

=== Bordering municipalities ===
The city is bordered by Radibor, Großdubrau and Malschwitz in the North, Kubschütz in the East, Großpostwitz, Obergurig and Doberschau-Gaußig in the South, as well as Göda in the West. All of these belong to the Bautzen district.

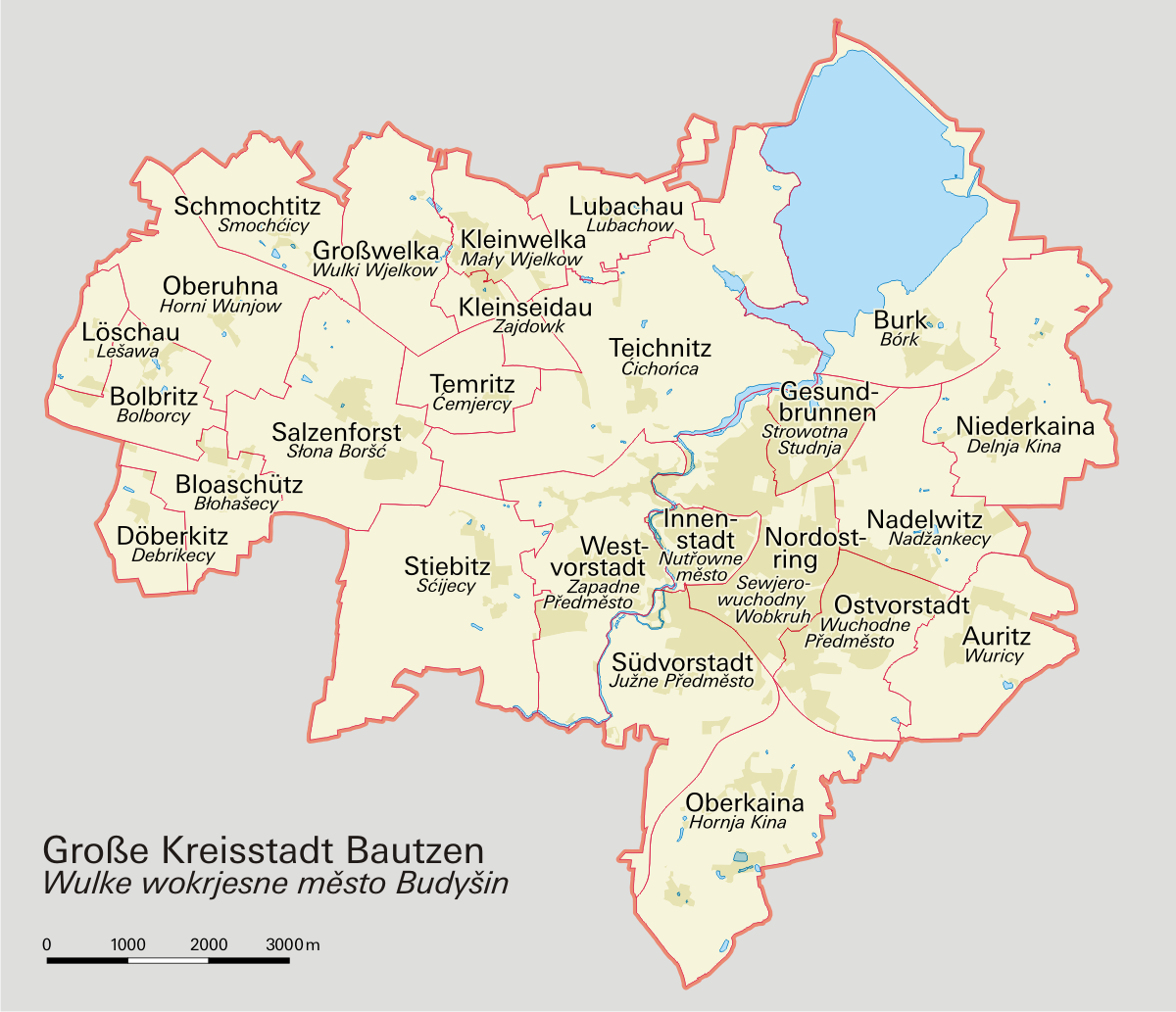
The city districts

=== Subdivisions ===
The 15 city districts are:

Name			Population (as of 1 January 2009)
German	Upper Sorbian	English translation	Population (as of 1 January 2009)
Innenstadt	Nutřkowne město	City centre	5,278
Südvorstadt	Južne Předměsto	Southern outskirts	1,738
Westvorstadt	Zapadne Předměsto	Western outskirts	3,505
Gesundbrunnen	Strowotna studnja	–	8,178
Nordostring	Sewjerowuchodny Wobkruh	North-eastern ring	10,727
Ostvorstadt	Wuchodne Předměsto	Eastern outskirts	6,360
Teichnitz	Ćichońca	–	377
Nadelwitz	Nadźankecy	–	268
Burk	Bórk	–	325
Oberkaina	Hornja Kina	–	832
Niederkaina	Delnja Kina	–	522
Stiebitz	Sćijecy	–	510
Kleinwelka	Mały Wjelkow	–	1,314
Salzenforst-Bolbritz	Słona Boršć-Bolborcy	–	839
Auritz	Wuricy	–	458

== History ==
Historical affiliations

Duchy of Poland 1002-1025
Kingdom of Poland 1025–1032
Margraviate of Meissen 1032-1075
Duchy of Bohemia 1075–1198
Kingdom of Bohemia 1198–1253
Margraviate of Brandenburg 1253-1319
Kingdom of Bohemia 1319-1469
Kingdom of Hungary 1469-1490
Kingdom of Bohemia 1490-1635
Electorate of Saxony 1635–1806
Kingdom of Saxony 1806-1871
German Empire 1871-1918
Weimar Republic 1918-1933
Nazi Germany 1933-1945
Allied-occupied Germany 1945-1949
East Germany 1949–1990
Germany 1990–present

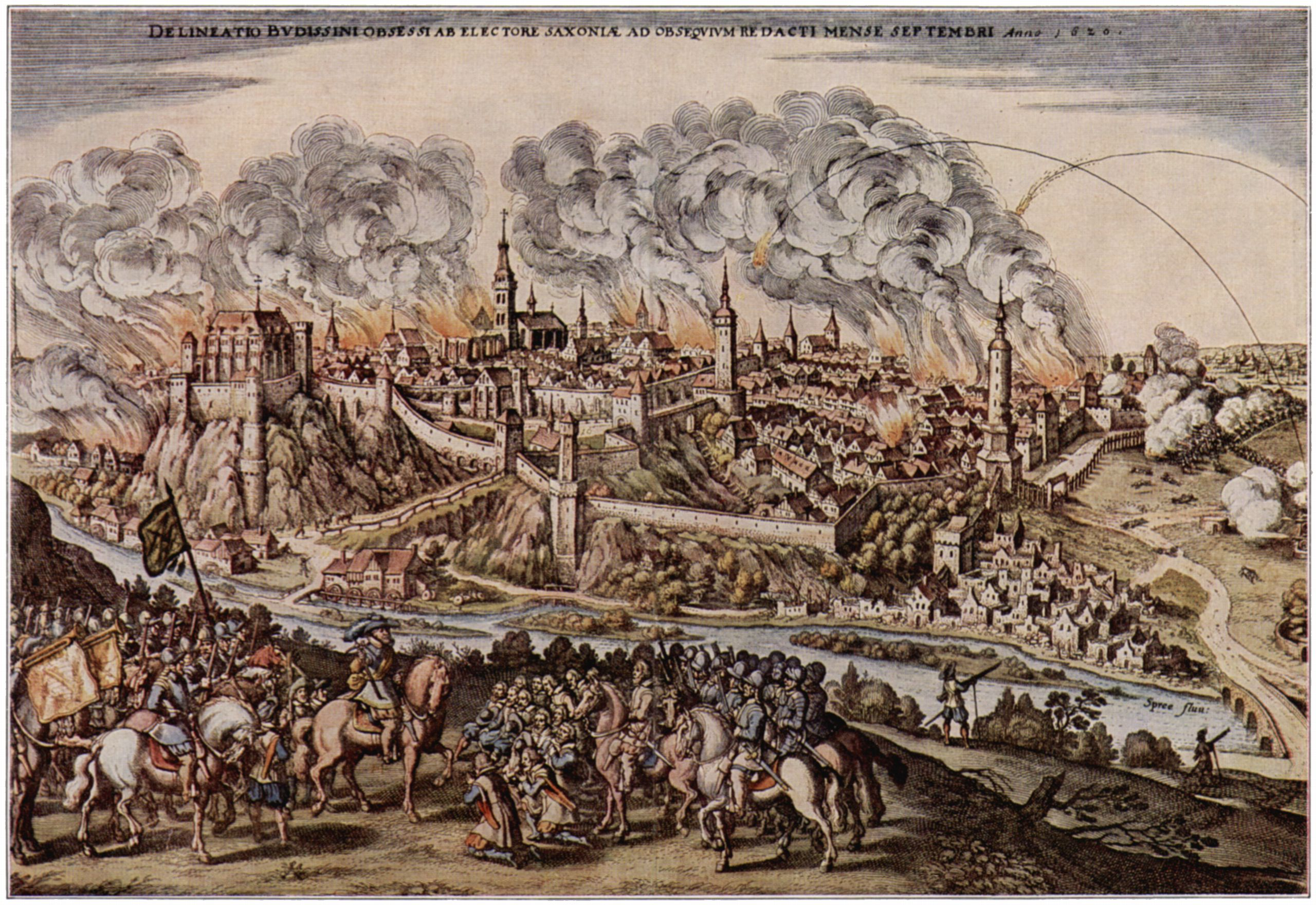
The siege and capture of Bautzen by John George I, Elector of Saxony, in September 1620

In the 3rd century AD an eastern Germanic settlement existed here, but excavations have proved that the region was already inhabited as early as the late Stone Age. Sorbs arrived in the area during the migration period in the 6th century AD.

The first written evidence of the city is from 1002 under the name Budusin (Upper Sorbian: Budyšin, Polish: Budziszyn). In 1018 the Peace of Bautzen was signed between the German king Henry II and the Polish ruler Bolesław I the Brave. The treaty left the town under Polish rule. In 1032 it passed to the Margraviate of Meissen within the Holy Roman Empire, in 1075 to the Duchy of Bohemia, elevated to a kingdom in 1198 (with short periods of Brandenburgian and Hungarian rule).

In 1346, Budissin became a member of the Lusatian League, an alliance of Upper Lusatian cities, also including Görlitz, Kamenz, Lauban, Löbau and Zittau. In 1429 and 1431, it was unsuccessfully besieged by the Hussites. In 1547, the town was subjected to the Upper Lusatian Pönfall, a punitive measure imposed by Ferdinand I in his capacity as King of Bohemia after political disobedience during the Schmalkaldic War, which resulted in the loss of self-governing privileges. In 1634, it was destroyed by the Swedes during the Thirty Years' War. In 1635, Budissin fell to the Electorate of Saxony, whose Prince-electors were also Polish kings in personal union from 1697 to 1763. One of two main routes connecting Warsaw and Dresden ran through the town at that time.

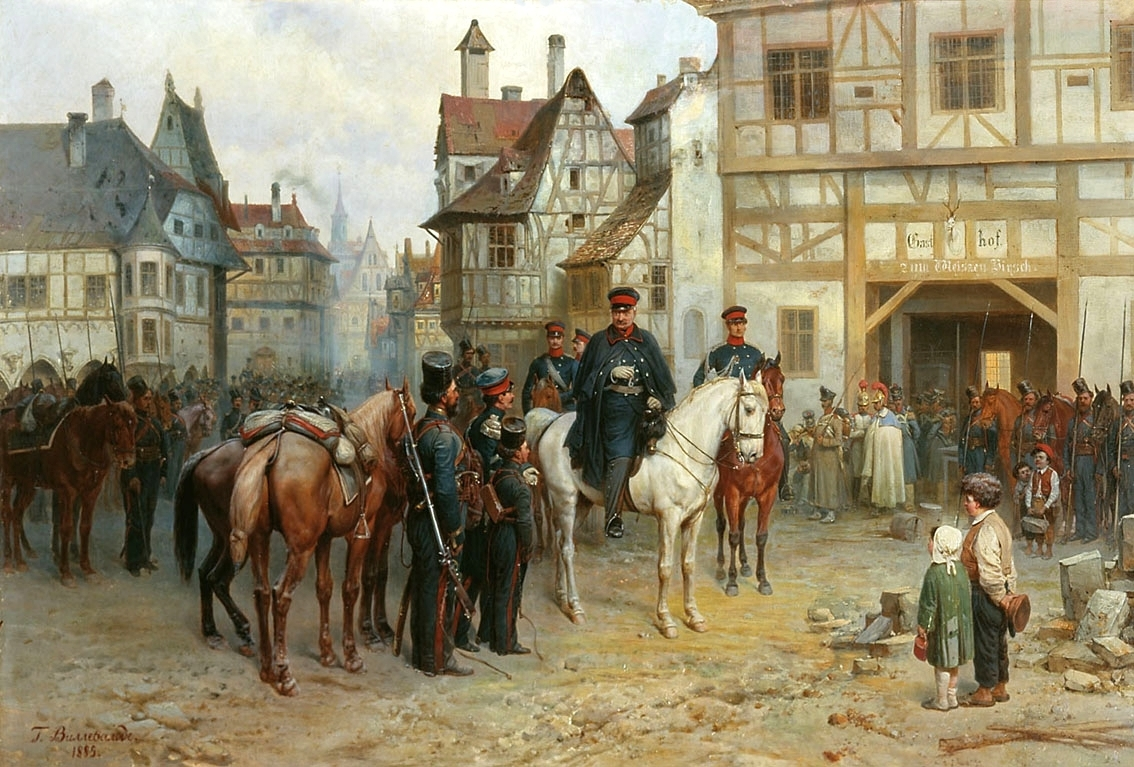
General Gebhard Leberecht von Blücher and Cossacks in Bautzen, 1813

During the Napoleonic Wars, it was the site of the Battle of Bautzen (1813). In 1868, the name was officially changed from Budissin to the more Germanized form Bautzen.

In 1839, the Sorbian student organization Societas Slavica Budissenensis was founded in the city. In 1845, the Sorbian national anthem was publicly performed for the first time in the city. The Sorbian House (Upper Sorbian: Serbski Dom), a Sorbian cultural centre, was opened in the city in 1904.

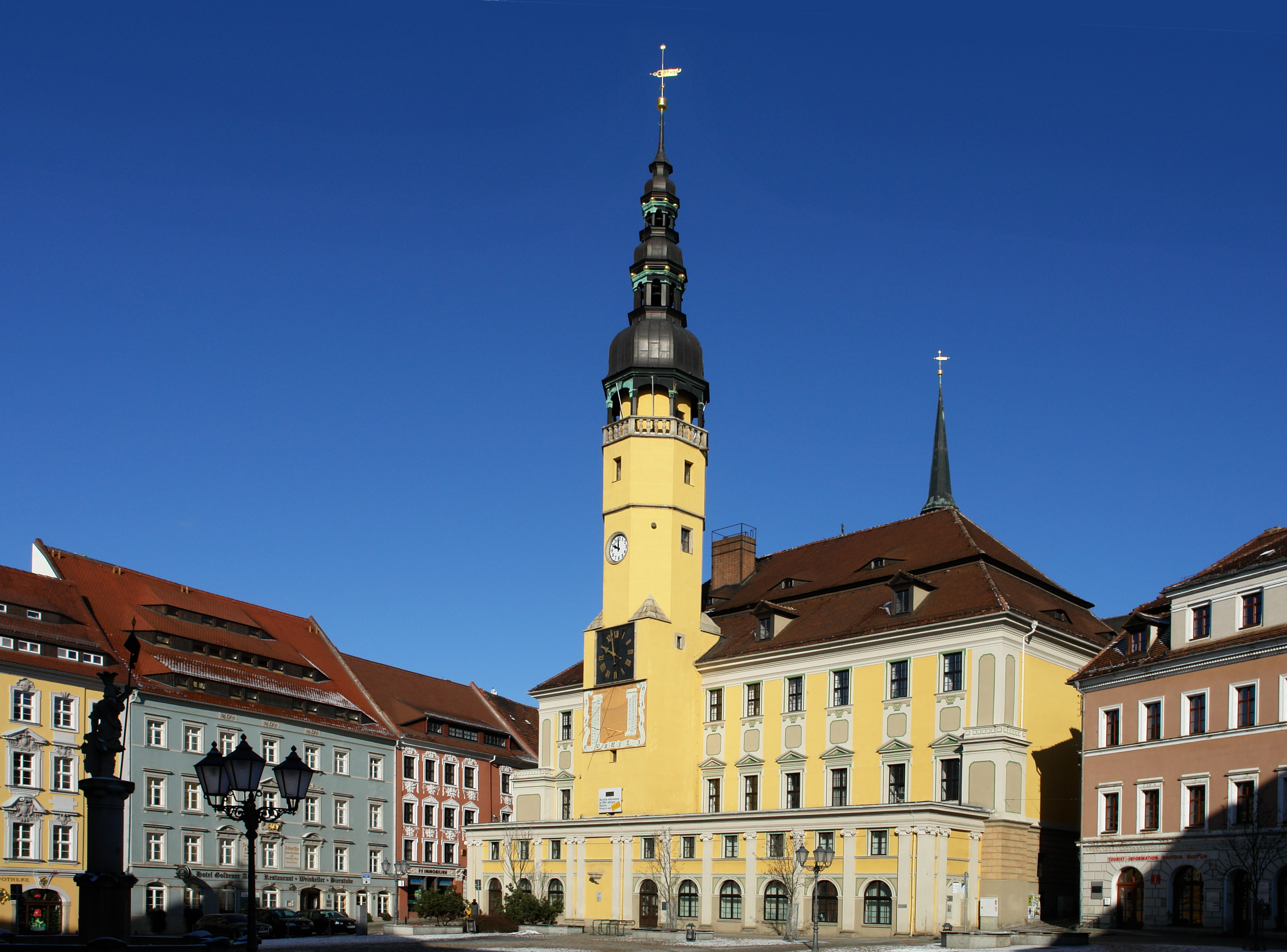
Bautzen town hall

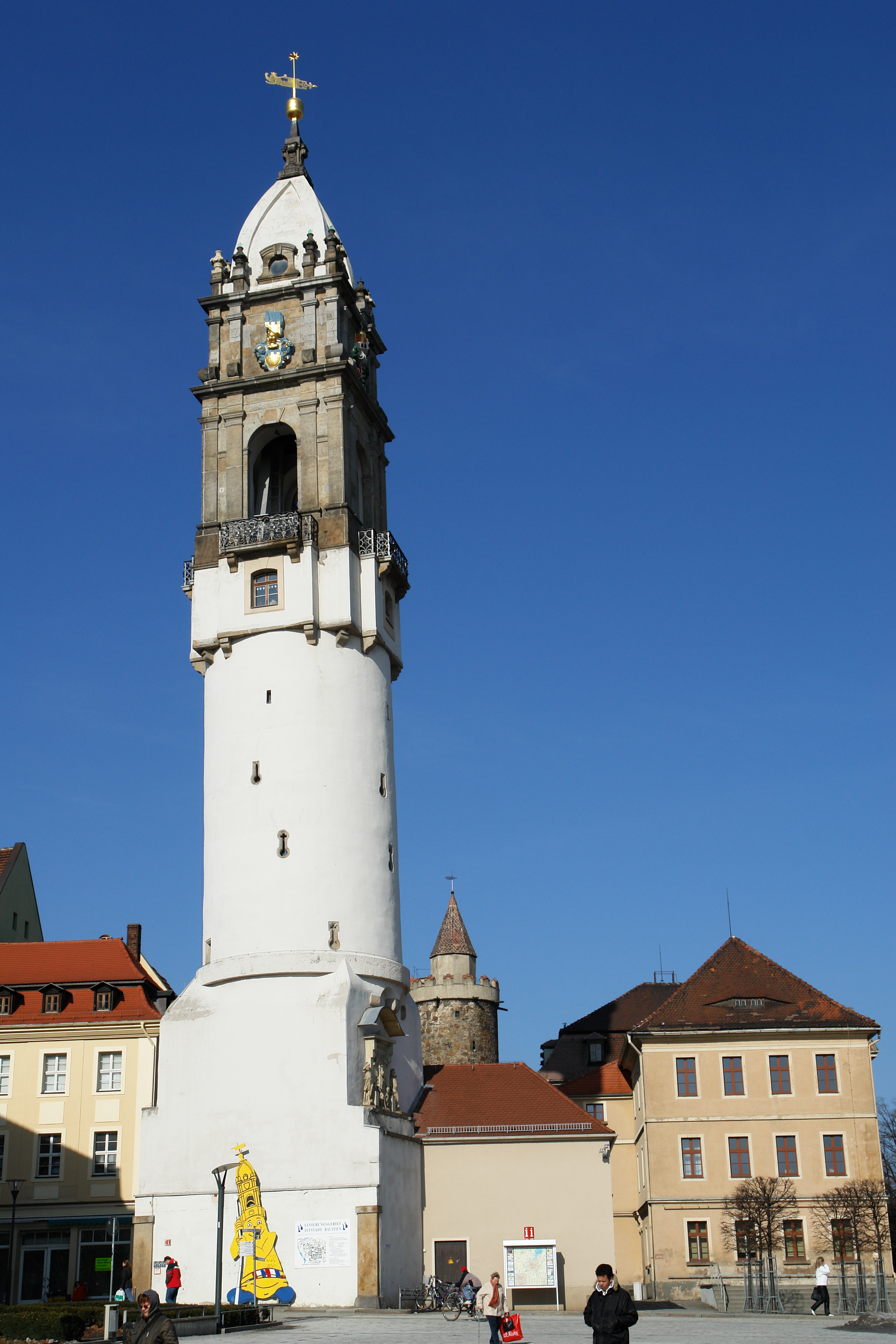
The leaning Reichenturm

After the Nazi Party came to power in Germany in 1933, many political prisoners were held in the Bautzen I and Bautzen II prisons, built in 1904 and 1906, respectively. During the Kristallnacht in 1938, local Jews were persecuted and Jewish-owned businesses were destroyed. During World War II, in 1942–1943, the Nazis conducted three trials of members of the Polish resistance at the local court, sentencing thirteen to death. The AL Bautzen subcamp of the Groß-Rosen concentration camp operated in Bautzen. At least 600 men, mostly Poles, but also of other nationalities, were imprisoned there, about 310 of whom died. Ernst Thälmann was imprisoned there before being deported to Buchenwald. In April 1945, the Germans evacuated many prisoners on foot to Nixdorf, where they were liberated by Polish troops on 8 May 1945, while the remaining prisoners were liberated in Bautzen by the Soviets on 20 April 1945. Between 21 and 30 April 1945, the Battle of Bautzen was fought which resulted in the town being recaptured by the German army. This meant Bautzen and its surroundings stayed in German hands until Germany's capitulation.

From 1952 to 1990, Bautzen was part of the Bezirk Dresden of East Germany. Bautzen was infamous throughout East Germany for its two penitentiaries. "Bautzen I" was used as an official prison, soon to be nicknamed Gelbes Elend ("Yellow Misery") due to its outer colour, whereas the more secretive "Bautzen II" was used as a facility to hold political prisoners, dissidents and prisoners of conscience. Today, Bautzen I is known as the Bautzen Correctional Institution and is used to hold prisoners who are awaiting trial. Bautzen II which was also operated by the GDR's Ministry for State Security, has served as an open memorial since 1993, operated by the Saxon Memorials Foundation. It is accessible to the public. Guided tours are provided and occasionally, films are screened. A permanent exhibition depicts the misery suffered by occupants; visitors may tour detention cells, the isolation area and the yards where prisoners were allowed to exercise.

In 2002 the city commemorated its 1000th birthday. In 2010 it was hit by a flood. In July 2026, a lithium-ion battery energy storage facility caught fire, burning for several days. Firefighters cooled the affected battery containers with up to 5,000 litres (1,100 imp gal; 1,300 US gal) of water per minute, drawing water from the Spree River to reduce strain on the municipal water supply. The incident led to evacuations and public warnings for residents to keep windows and doors closed.

== Population development ==
During the Early Middle Ages, Bautzen was one of the largest cities in Central Germany. However, from around the 15th century, its population growth began to stagnate. The relatively late onset of industrialization in Bautzen brought new momentum, leading to population growth even during the era of East Germany. Following the Peaceful Revolution of 1990, however, the city’s population declined significantly, dropping from 52,000 in 1989 to around 38,000, largely due to emigration and low birth rates. Since the early 2000s, this decline has slowed considerably. Today, Bautzen ranks as the 10th largest city in Saxony by population.

As of 31 December 2011, 98.3% of Bautzen's residents were of German origin, with 6.1% having a migration background.

Population development of Bautzen from 1871 to 2017

(as of 31 December unless otherwise stated)

- 1849 – 10,518
- 1868 – 12,623
- 1875 – 14,709
- 1890 – 21,516
- 1933 – 41,951
- 1950 – 41,592 (as of 31 August)
- 1960 – 41,613
- 1984 – 51,208
- 1995 – 44,763
- 2000 – 43,353
- 2005 – 42,150
- 2010 – 40,573
- 2015 – 40,501
- 2020 – 38,006
- 2021 - 38,360
- 2022 - 38,682

== Politics ==
The Bautzen City Council consists of 34 members. It meets either in the Town Hall or in the Gewandhaus. There are also four local councils (Niederkaina, Stiebitz, Kleinwelka, and Salzenforst-Bolbritz), whose honorary members are elected for five years.

=== Mayors ===
- Konrad Johannes Kaeubler, Lord Mayor (1890–1918)
- Gottfried Franz Hermann Niedner, (1872–1945), Lord Mayor 1918–1933
- Christian Schramm (born 1952), (CDU), (Lord) Mayor 1990–2015
- Alexander Ahrens (born 1966), (independent), Lord Mayor 2015–2022

== Main sights ==
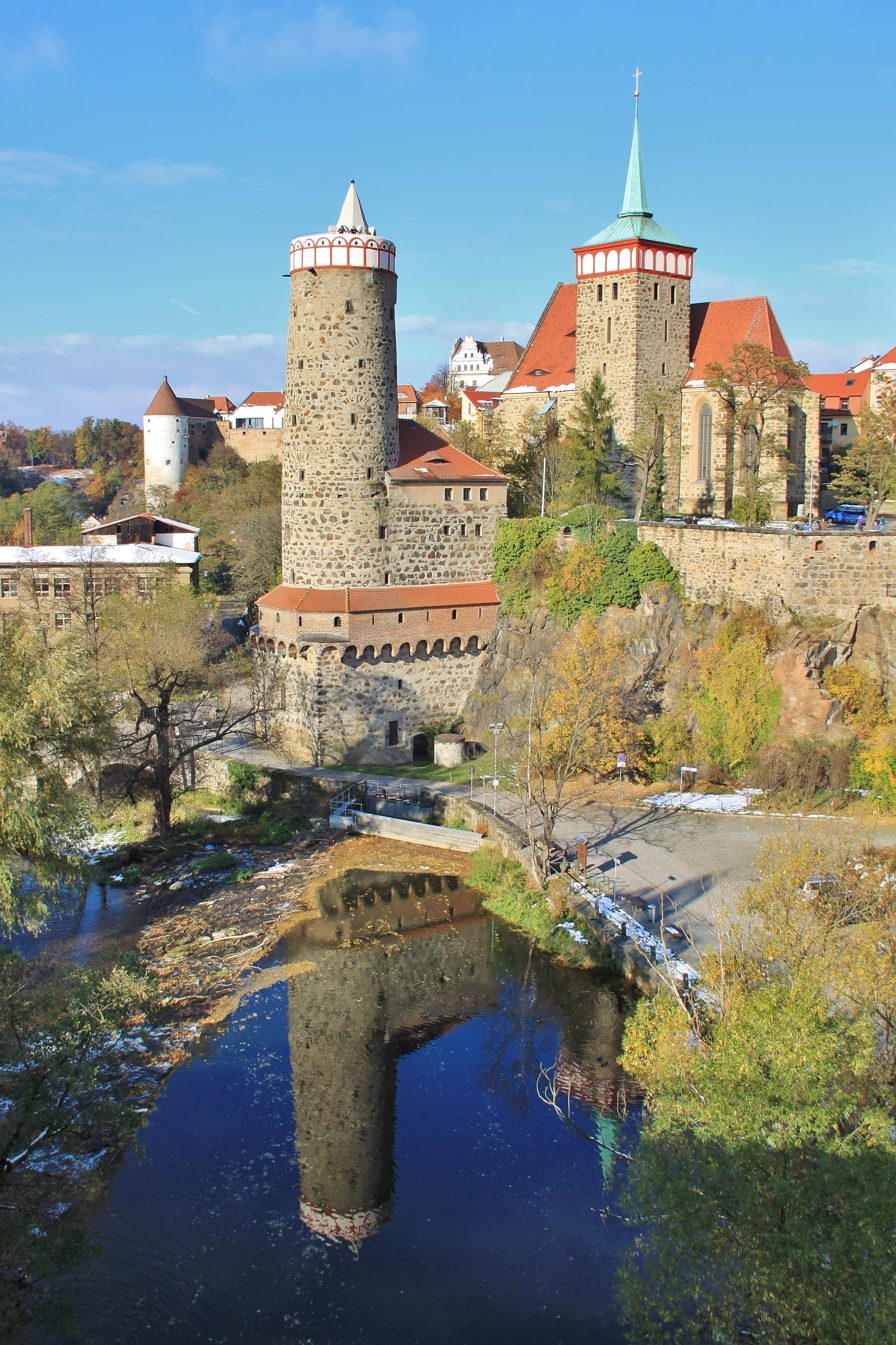
Old Waterworks and Church of St. Michael

Bautzen has a very compact and well-preserved medieval town centre with numerous churches and towers and a city wall on the steep embankment to the river Spree, with one of the oldest preserved waterworks in central Europe (built 1558).

Sites of interest include:

- The Reichenturm, one of the steepest leaning and still passable towers north of the Alps
- Ortenburg Castle
- The Old Waterworks, an architectural monument and museum
- Saint Peter's Cathedral, Eastern Germany's only historic interdenominational church edifice
- Hexenhaus (Witch's House), oldest preserved residential building (built in 1604)

There are six museums in Bautzen, including the Stadtmuseum Bautzen ("Bautzen city Museum"), the Sorbisches Museum ("Sorbian Museum", Sorbian: Serbski muzej) and the Senfmuseum (Mustard Museum).

== Sorbian institutions ==
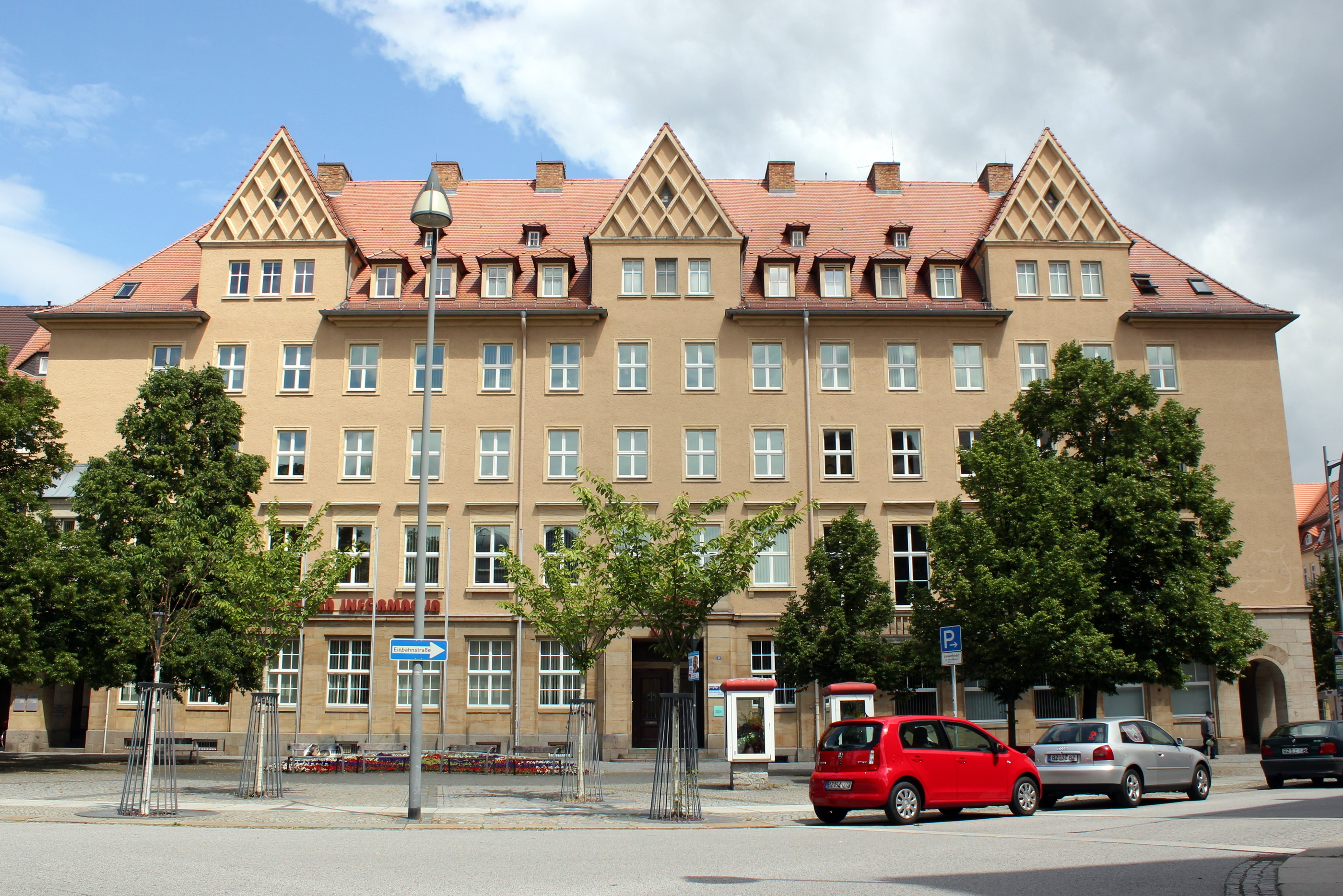
Sorbian House (Serbski dom), headquarters of various Sorbian organizations

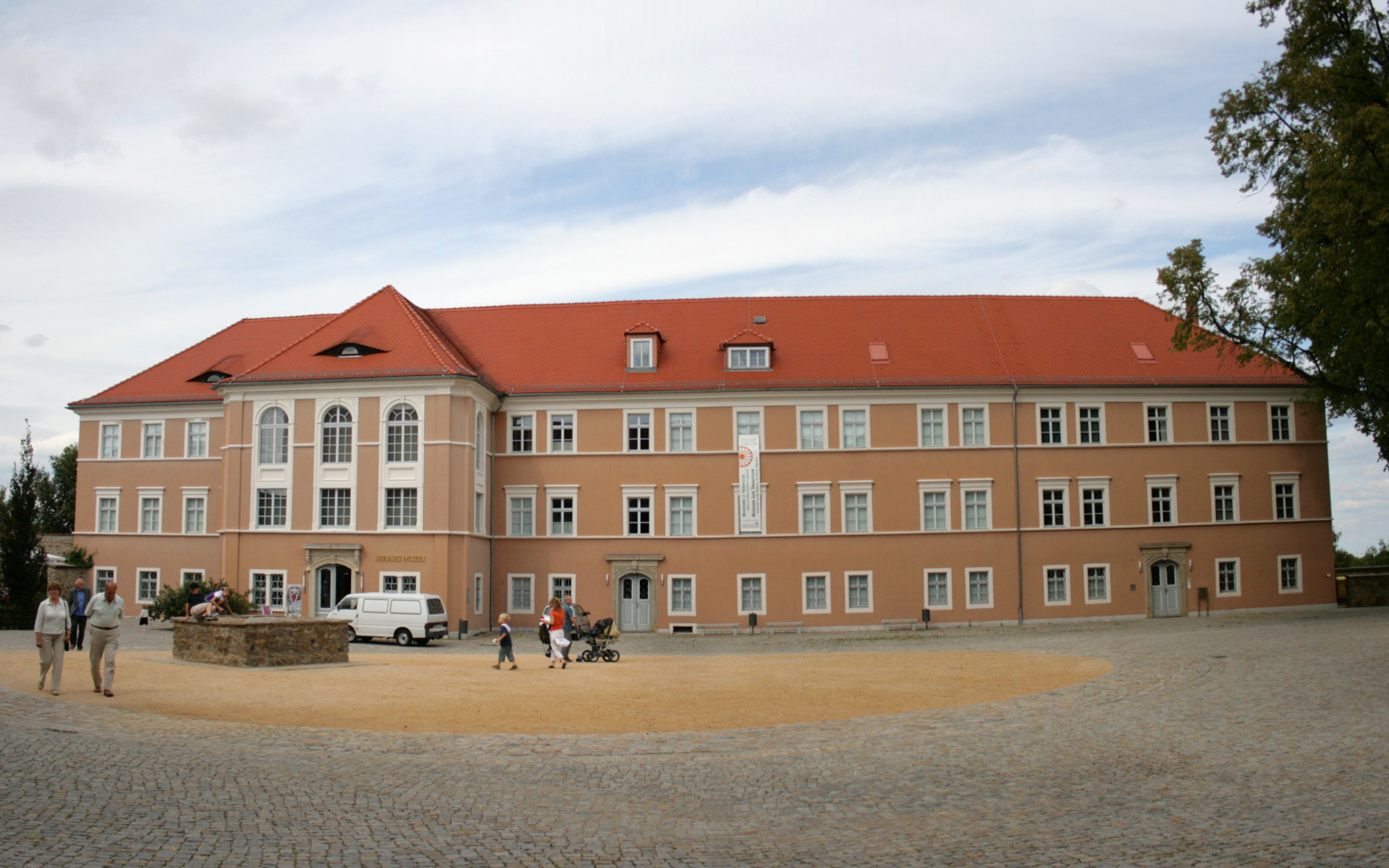
Sorbian Museum (Serbski muzej)

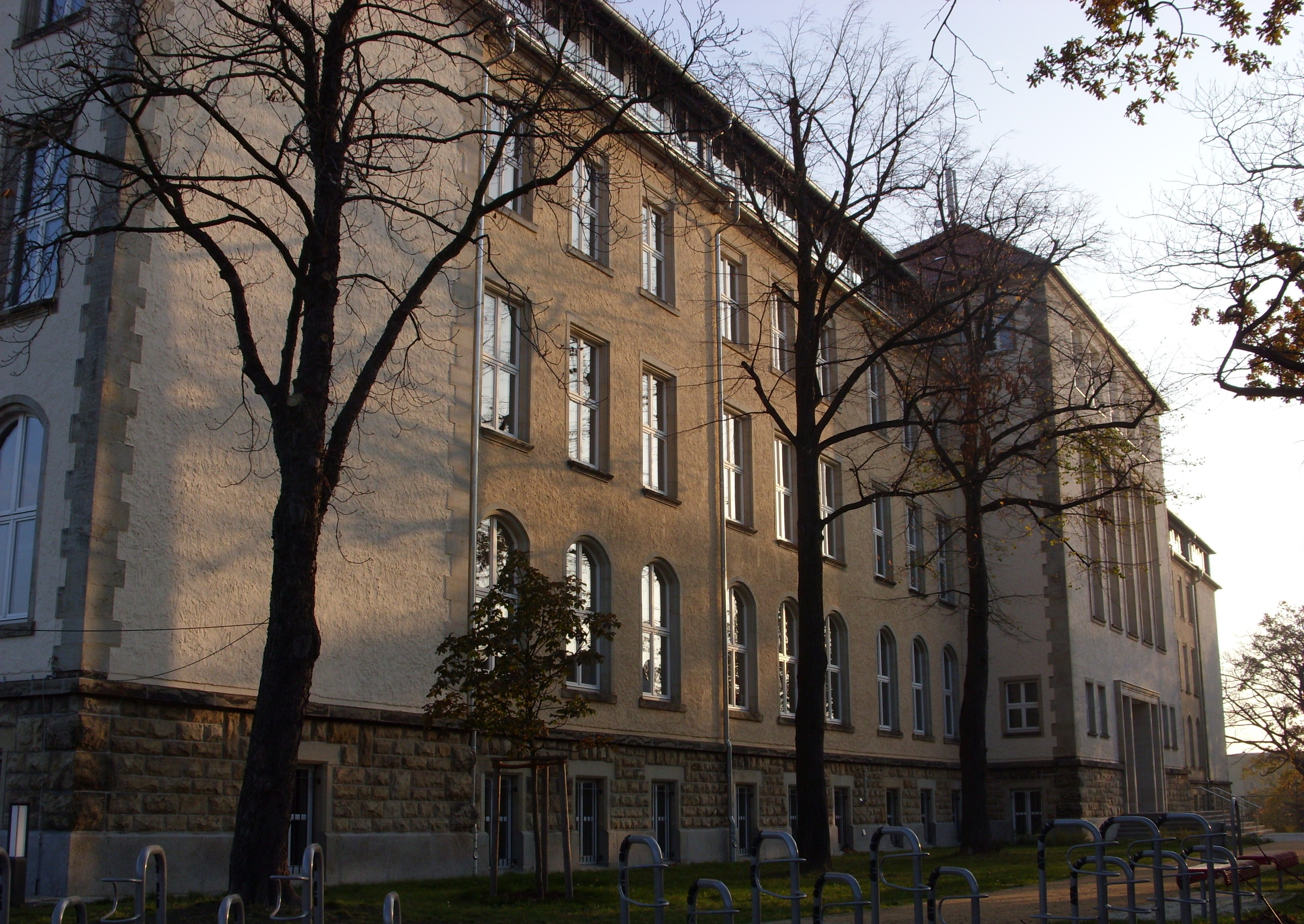
Sorbian gymnasium (Serbski gymnazij)

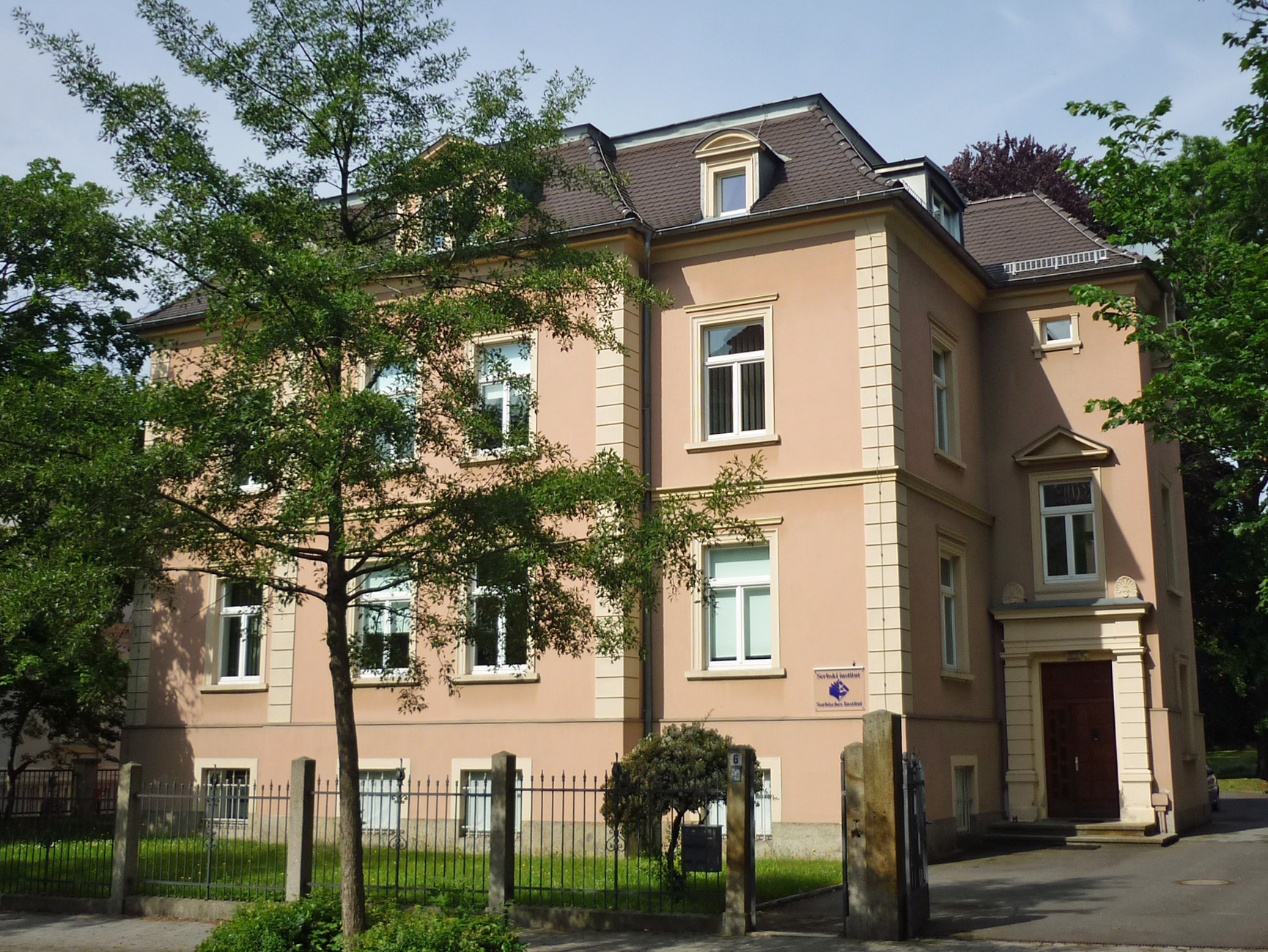
Sorbian Institute (Serbski institut)

Bautzen is the seat of several institutions of the cultural self-administration of the Sorbian people:

- Foundation for the Sorbian People (Stiftung für das sorbische Volk, Załožba za serbski lud)
- Domowina (poet. Sorbian for „Homeland“, actually: Zwjazk Łužiskich Serbow z. t., Bund Lausitzer Sorben e. V.) – the umbrella organization of Sorbian cultural associations and institutions
- Sorbian Institute (Serbski institut)
- Sorbian Radio (Serbski rozhłós)
- Sorbian National Ensemble and the German-Sorbian People's Theater (Němsko-serbske ludowe dźiwadło)
- Bautzen Sorbian Boarding School

== Economy ==
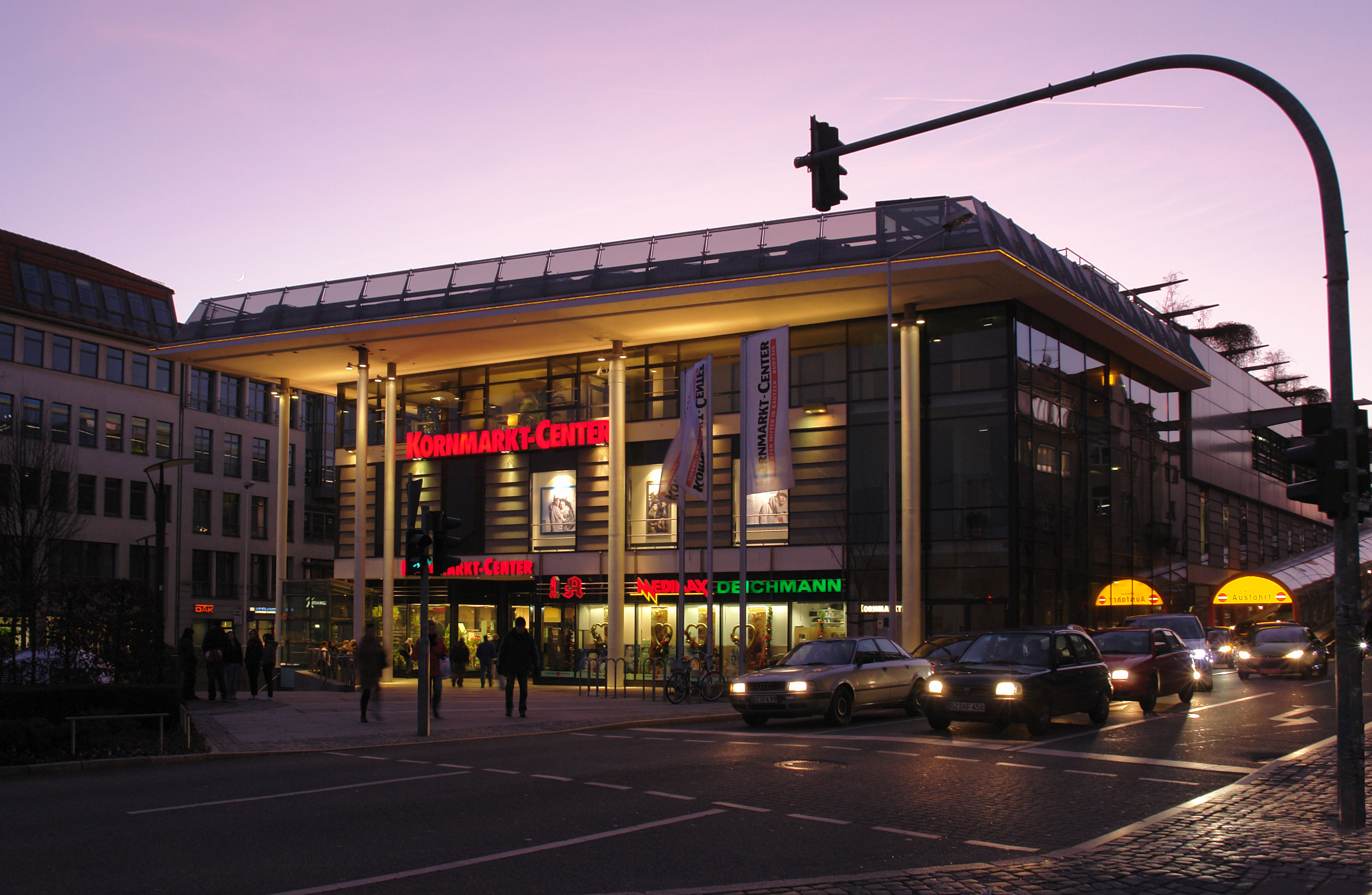
Kornmarktcenter is the largest shopping center in Bautzen.

Alstom Transportation operates a large factory on Fabrikstraße making railway locomotives, carriages and trams. It was built by the former VEB Waggonbau Bautzen, which was acquired by Bombardier Transportation in 1998 via Deutsche Waggonbau and acquired by Alstom when Bombardier Transportation was sold by parent Bombardier Inc. in 2021.

The mustard Bautz'ner Senf is produced in Bautzen. It is the market leader in the new states of Germany with a market share of 65 percent.

== Notable people ==
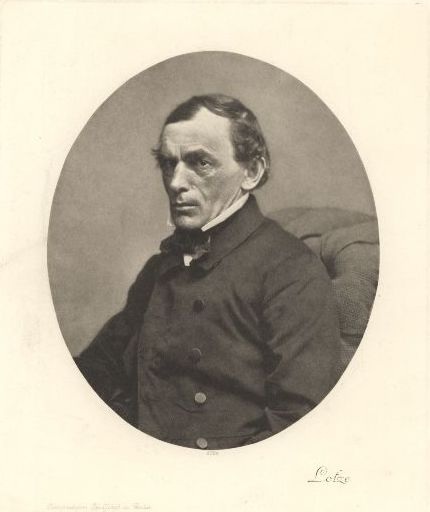
Hermann Lotze

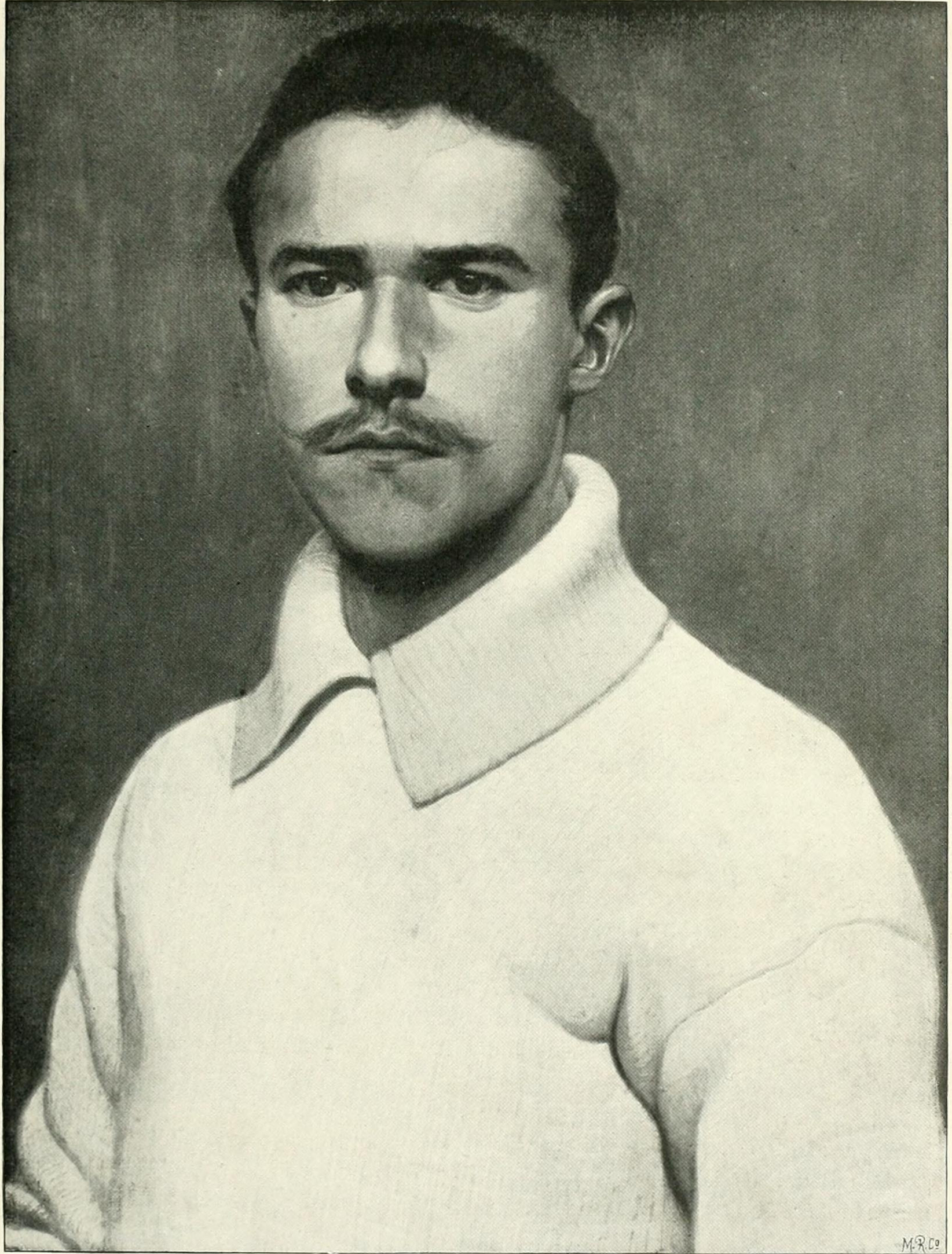
Hans Unger self-portrait

- Walter von Boetticher (1853–1945), historian and physician
- Karl Gustav Brescius (1824–1864), railway engineer
- Rudolf Buchheim (1820–1879), German pharmacologist
- Wilhelm Buck (1869–1945), Prime Minister of the Free State of Saxony
- Friedrich August Carus (1770–1807), psychologist and philosopher
- Kurt Dinter (1868–1945), botanist and explorer in South West Africa
- Werner von Erdmannsdorff (1891–1945), General of Infantry in World War II
- Will Grohmann (1887–1968), art historian and art critic
- Erhard Heinz (1924–2017), mathematician
- Hermann Hunger (born 1942), Austrian assyriologist
- Stefanie Kloß (born 1984), lead singer of pop rock band Silbermond
- Hermann Lotze (1817–1881), German philosopher and logician
- August Gottlieb Meißner (1753–1807), writer, founder of the German crime novel
- Juro Mětšk (1954–2022), composer
- Harald Metzkes (1929–2026), painter and graphic artist
- Ferdinand Neuling (1885–1960), General of Infantry in World War II
- Caspar Peucer (1525–1602), German-Sorbian reformer, physician and scholar
- Charles Gottlieb Raue (1820–1896), American homeopathic physician
- Georg-Hans Reinhardt (1887–1963), Colonel-General of the German Wehrmacht
- Simone Ritscher (born 1959), actress
- Friedrich Wilhelm Ehrenfried Rost (1768–1835), theologian and philosopher
- Hans von Tettau (1888–1956), infantry General
- Hans Unger (1872–1936), painter
- Karl Friedrich Gottlob Wetzel (1779–1819), writer
- Handrij Zejler (1804–1872), born in the district Salzenforst, founder of modern Sorbian poetry
- Michael Eifert (born 1997), professional boxer

== Twin towns – sister cities ==
Bautzen is twinned with:

- Worms, Germany (1990)
- Heidelberg, Germany (1991)
- Dreux, France (1992)
- Jablonec nad Nisou, Czech Republic (1993)
- Jelenia Góra, Poland (1993)
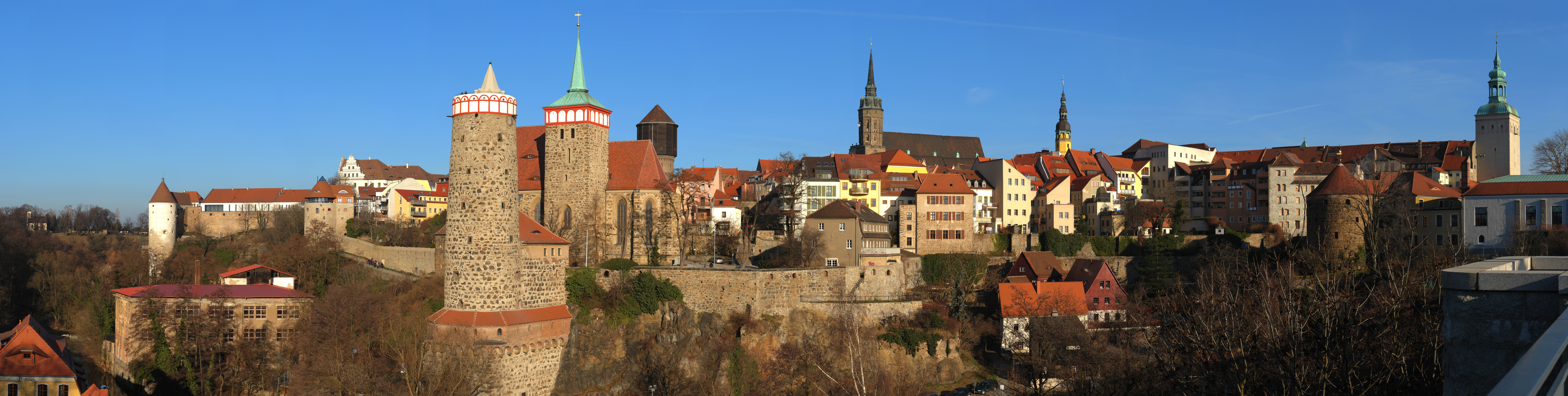
Panorama of Bautzen viewed from the Peace Bridge
