= Karl Heinrich Seibt =

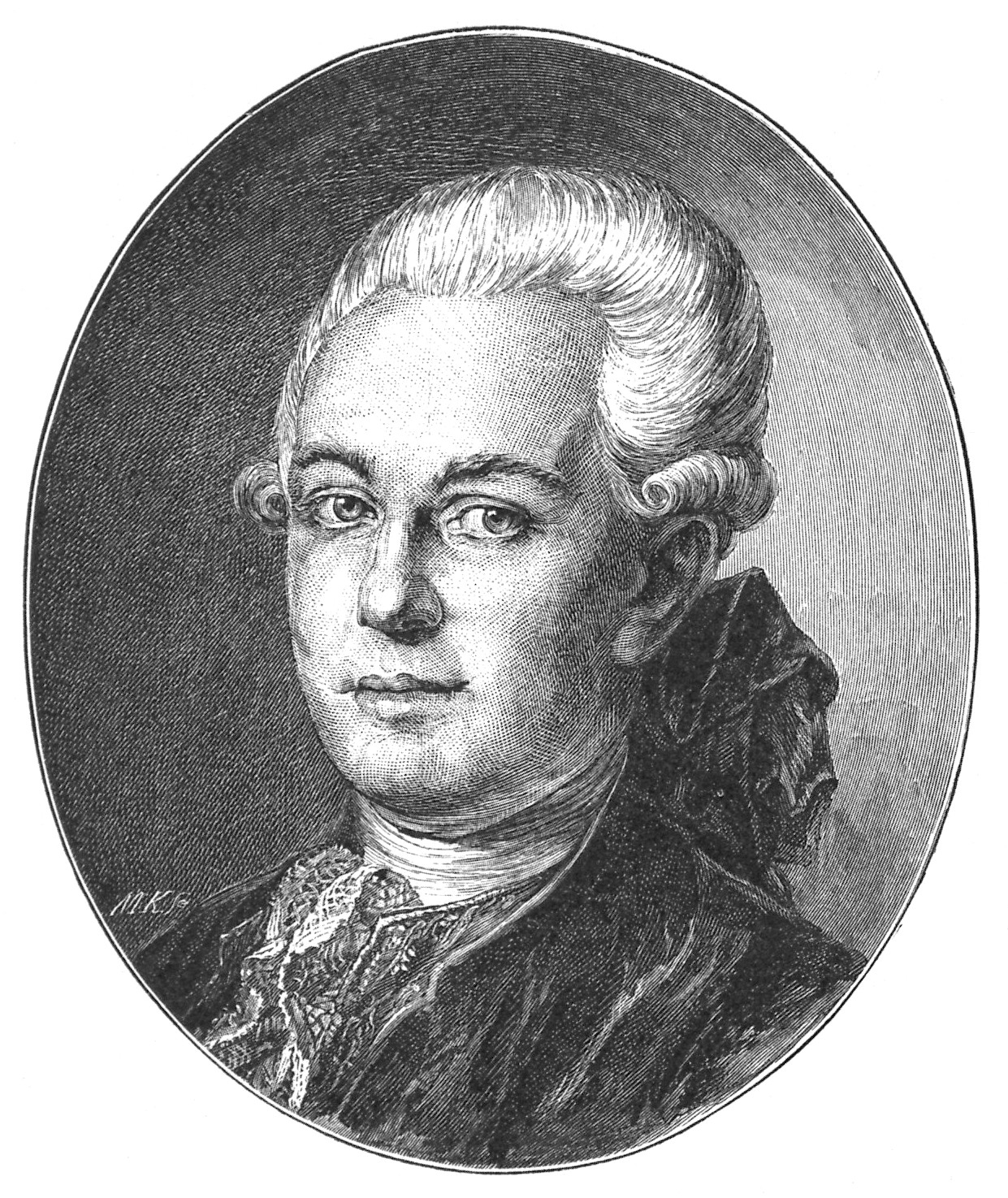
Portrait of Seibt by Achaz Rähmel, engraved by Wilhelm Hecht

Karl Heinrich Seibt (21 March 1735 – 2 April 1806) was a pioneering German Catholic theologian and teacher.

== Life ==
Karl Heinrich von Seibt was born in Mariental (Oberlausitz), a long-established settlement on the banks of the Neisse river at the northern frontier of Bohemia, which at that time (and by many criteria till 1945) was culturally and linguistically German. At the time of his birth his father was a "Klostersekretär" (monastery administrator) working for the monastery around which the little village clustered, and at which, according to some sources, Karl Heinrich was born.

He received his first formal education the monastery, before moving on for an education in "the humanities" at the Piarist Gymnasium (secondary school) run by the monks at Kosmanos a short distance to the south of his home village. It was probably in 1751 that he entered Prague University where between 1751 and 1753 the focus of his studies was on Philosophy. Between 1753 and 1756 he concentrated on the study of Jurisprudence. According to one source it was because he was troubled by the extent to which Prague University was dominated by Jesuits that in 1756 he switched to Leipzig University, now studying (again) Philosophy and Philology (German, French and English). At Leipzig Seibt studied History, Philosophy and Aesthetics. He was powerfully influenced by two leading representatives of the German Enlightenment; the poet-rhetorician Christian Fürchtegott Gellert (1715-1769) and the (at the time) widely revered writer Johann Christoph Gottsched (1700-1766). Between 1756 and 1760 Leipzig came under Prussian military occupation in the context of the Seven Years' War. The soldiers presumably brought disruption and plague to the city: students stayed away and Seibt eventually returned to Prague. By 1762 he was delivering lectures at Prague's Wendisches Seminar, a training institution for preparing Catholic priests. The lectures were unpaid. According to one source he delivered them out of love for his homeland and of lecturing.

The empress was known to take a close personal interest in education reform, and it appears to have been in response to a personal approach by Seibt to Maria Theresa herself in January 1763 Seibt was offered an appointment backed by the University Commission and the Philosophy Directorate to take a post at Prague University as professor of "Fine Arts and Humanities" ("...der schönen Wissenschaften") at the University Philosophy Faculty. His extraordinary professorship was confirmed that same year through a decree dated 19 November. "The Fine Arts and Humanities" which he now taught at Prague encompassed Ethics, Education Sciences, German style along with History and related topics. Seibt organised his classes into four cohorts. He represented a new generation, influenced by enlightenment thinking which many still found unnerving, but which in the Holy Roman Empire enjoyed strong support from the empress and from her equally formidable Prussian rival. Seibt was one of the first at Prague University to deliver his lectures in German (rather than simply in Latin), and he also saw to it that students became familiar with (at the time) revolutionary ideas coming out of France, England and Scotland. He introduced them to the works and ideas of Pope, Gottsched, Gellert, Shakespeare and Charles Rollin, along with contemporaries such as David Hume and Charles Batteux.

One of Seibt's first known published works, which appeared in 1765, was a funeral oration celebrating Francis I, who died in August of that year. The 1773 suppression of the Jesuits by the pope took effect relatively promptly in the Habsburg lands and removed a hitherto important source of conservative resistance to enlightenment secularism in the world of Catholic education. In 1775 Karl Heinrich Seibt took over the directorship of the Philosophy faculty at the university, also becoming director of no fewer than three secondary schools ("Gymnasia") in the city.

In January 1783, Seibt was elected to serve a term as university rector. In the end - unusually - he served a double (two year) term. In 1785 he took over a full professorship in Theology and Philosophy, while surrendering his professorship embracing Ethics and Classical Literature which was taken on by August Gottlieb Meißner, the first Protestant to take a teaching post at the university for nearly 150 years. In 1796 Seibt took over as Dean of the Philosophy Faculty.

In 1794, Seibt was elevated to the knighthood in recognition of his services to education. Karl Heinrich Seibt became Karl Heinrich von Seibt. He retired from his professorship and other appointments in 1801, the importance of his contribution to the development of teaching at the university widely acknowledged by colleagues. He remained in Prague, and died there on 2 April 1806.

== Legacy ==
Grimm identifies Seibt as one of the most important and influential thinkers under the Habsburg monarchy of the Enlightened absolutism period. By refusing to conduct his lectures in Latin he greatly stimulated the arts and culture in Prague. Seibt exercised a strong influence on the successor generation of academics and philosophers in Bohemia, including Josef Dobrovský. By the end of the nineteenth century the abandonment of Latin as a universal language for the multi-ethnic Habsburg lands was leading not to its replacement with German but to the increased application of a series of regional languages such as (in Bohemia) Czech, and across the border to the north various Sorbian dialects.

== Works (selection) ==
- Von dem Einfluß der schönen Wissenschaften auf die Ausbildung des Verstandes; eine Rede. Prag 1764
- Trauerrede, dem höchstseligen Hintritt Franz I., Römischen Kaisers geweiht. Wien 1765
- Von dem Nutzen der Moral in der Beredsamkeit. Prag 1767
- Schreiben an den unbekannten Uebersetzer der Abhandlungen von Tugenden und Belohnungen. Prag 1769
- Vom Unterschied des Zierlichen im Hof- und Curialstyl. Prag 1769
- Academische Vorübungen aus seinen gehaltenen Vorlesungen über die deutsche Schreibart. Prag 1769
- Academische Reden und Abhandlungen. Prag 1771
- Academische Vorübungen aus den von ihm gehaltenen Vorlesungen über die deutsche Schreibart. Prag 1771
- Rede von dem Einfluß der Erziehung auf die Glückseligkeit des Staats. Prag 1771
- Von den Hülfsmitteln einer guten deutschen Schreibart, eine Rede ammt einigen dahin gehörigen Ausarbeitungen. Prag 1773
- Ueber die Vortheile eines empfindsamen Herzens, eine Rede. Prag 1773
- Gabrieli Montalte, ein Trauerspiel in einem Act. Dresden 1776
- Katholisches Lehr und Gebetbuch. Prag 1779, Bamberg 1780, Salzburg 1780, Salzburg 1783, München 1816 (Online)
- Neues katholisches Lehr- und Gebetbuch. 2te rechtmäßige durchaus verbesserte und sehr vermehrte Ausgabe. Prag und Dresden 1783, 3. Ausg. Salzburg 1784, Prag 1788 (1787), Salzburg 1790, Prag 1816, Augsburg 1818
- Academische Blumenlese. Prag 1784 (Online)
- Lehr- und Gebetbuch für die katholische Jugend. Bamberg und Würzburg, 1792, (Online); 1839, Augsburg, 1839, 4. Aufl., (Online); Augsburg, 1846, 5. Aufl., (Online);
- Klugheitslehre, practisch abgehandelt in academischen Vorlesunge. Prag 1799 2. Bde., 2. Aufl. Prag 1815 2. Bde. (Bd. 2 online), 3. Aufl. Prag 1824 2 Bde. (Bd. 1 online)
