= Charles Gottlieb Raue =

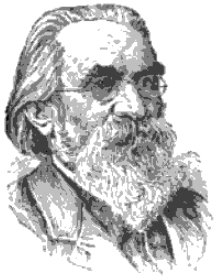
- Born: 11 May 1820; Nieder-Kunnersdorf, Brandenburg
- Died: 21 August 1896 (aged 76); Philadelphia, Pennsylvania
- Education: Philadelphia Medical College
- Occupation(s): Physician, homeopath

Charles Gottlieb Raue or Charles Godlove Raue (11 May 1820 – 21 August 1896) was a United States homeopathic physician.

== Biography ==
He was born in Nieder-Kunnersdorf in Brandenburg. He graduated from the College of Teachers in Bautzen, Saxony, in 1841, and at Philadelphia Medical College in 1850. From 1864 until 1871, he was professor of pathology and practice at the Homeopathic College of Pennsylvania, and at Hahnemann Medical College in Philadelphia.

He died at his home in Philadelphia on 21 August 1896.

== Writings ==
- Die neue Seelenlehre Dr. Beneke's, nach methodischen Grundsätzen für Lehrer bearbeitet (Bautzen, 1847)
- Special Pathology and Diagnostics with Therapeutic Hints (Philadelphia, 1868); and Annual Record of Homœopathic Literature (New York, 1870).

== See also ==
- Friedrich Eduard Beneke
