= August Gottlieb Meißner =

German writer

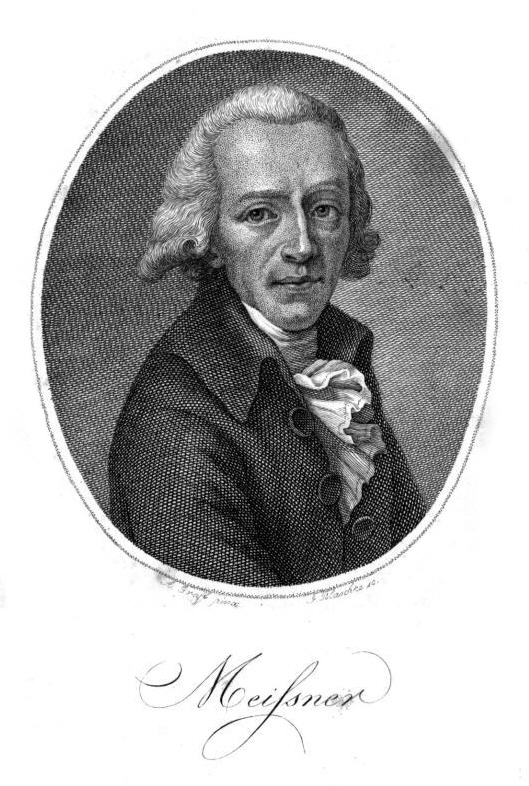
August Gottlieb Meißner

August Gottlieb Meissner (3 November 1753 – 18 February 1807) was a German writer of the Enlightenment and is considered the founder of the German detective story.

== Life ==
Meissner was born in Bautzen. His father, who died in 1761, was a government quartermaster. From 1764 to 1772, Meissner attended the school in Löbau and graduated with a degree in law from the University of Wittenberg on 18 September 1772. In 1774, he moved to the University of Leipzig, where he finished his studies in 1776. During his studies, he developed a passion for the theater and poetry. At the urging of his mother, he went to Dresden and joined the Federation of Free Masons. After traveling through Austria in 1785, he was offered the position of professor of aesthetics and classical literature at the University of Prague. In 1805, he went to Fulda to take up the position of director of the school, which he retained until his death. He died in Fulda, aged 53.

Meissner married Johanna Becker in 1783, and they had several children. His daughter Bianca married the German art historian and art patron Johann Gottlob von Quandt as her second husband. The poet Alfred Meissner was his grandson.

== Literary work and importance ==
Meissner's literary debut was in 1776 with the text of the comic opera Das Grab des Mufti oder die zwei Geizigen (The grave of the Mufti, or the two misers), which premiered in Leipzig on 17 January 1779.

Meissner's significance in German literature lies in his development of the new genre of the detective story. Though there were representations of crime in the form of sensational journalism and collections of legal cases, which were sometimes very popular, Meissner's separation of legal and moral accountability of a crime made his tales of true crime the best-sellers of his time. He shifted the focus of his stories from the criminal offense and its punishment to the psychological and social sources of the crime. The reader becomes acquainted with the offender before the criminal act occurs, learns about the circumstances and motives of the crime, and joins the criminal in court.

Meissner's narrative tradition was continued by Schiller, in his Crimes of Lost Honor, and Kleist. The detective story flowered in Germany in the 19th century. The genre is also known as Meissner's contribution to the Enlightenment as his works caused a "humanization" of the law by incorporating the social and psychological origins of crime. By 1800, psychological reports were accepted as relevant and were also cited in legal judgments.

Meissner wrote various fables. One of the best known is Sonne und Wind (The Sun and the Wind) which is often mistakenly attributed to Johann Gottfried von Herder. He also undertook translations from English, such as Der Unsichtbare Kundschafter, a translation of Eliza Haywood's The Invisible Spy.

== Detective stories ==
Meissner published more than 50 detective stories which were very successful. The titles of some of these stories are:

- "Mord aus Schwärmerey"
- "Unkeusche, Mörderin, Mordbrennerin, und doch blos ein unglückliches Mädchen"
- "Blutschänder, Feuerleger und Mörder zugleich, den Gesetzen nach, und doch ein Jüngling von edler Seele"
- "Mörder seiner Verlobten und Räuber! dann eine Zeitlang redlicher Mann; seltsam entdeckt, noch seltsamer sich selbst angebend"
