= Cottbus =

Cottbus Chóśebuz
- Town
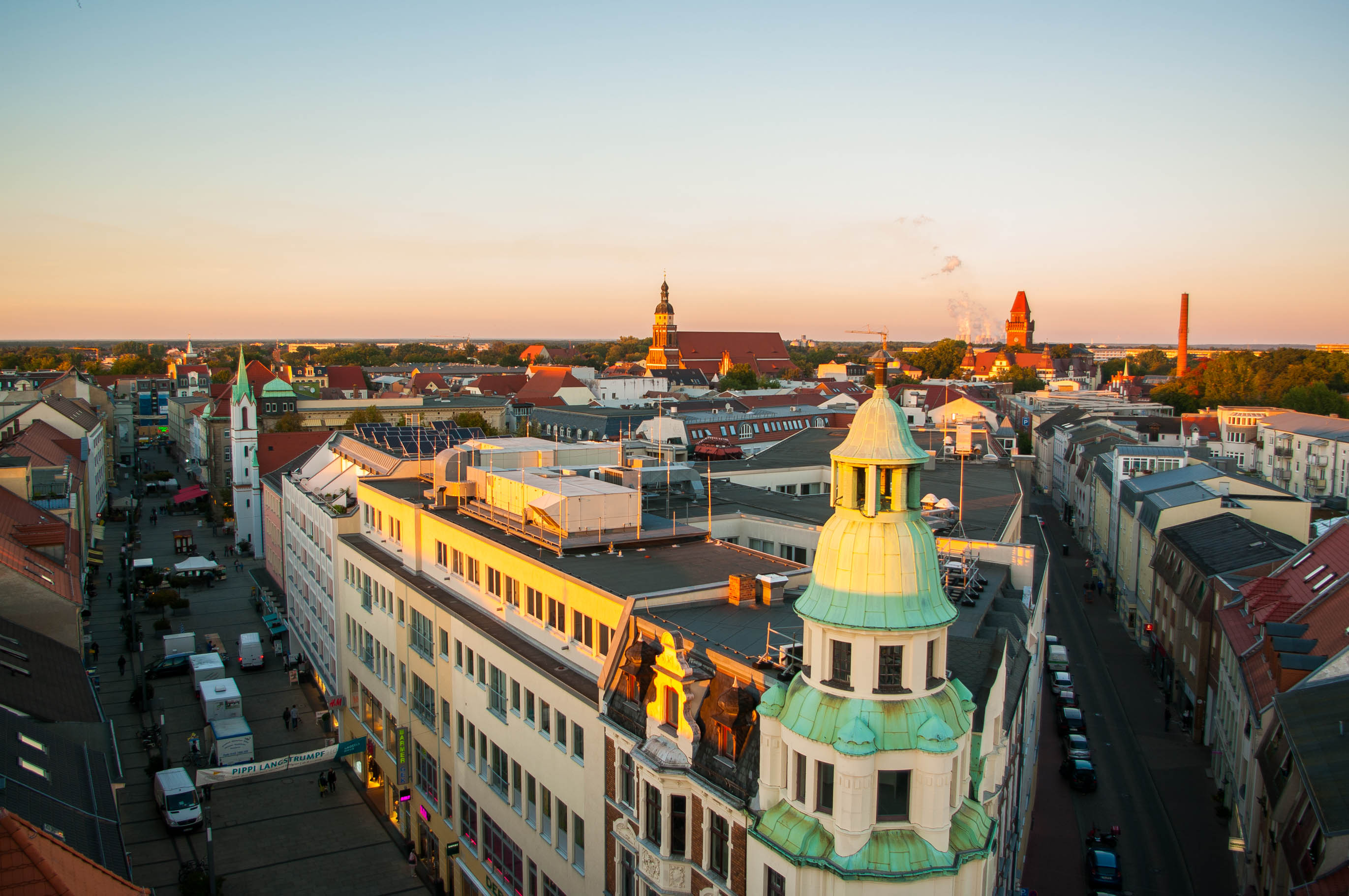
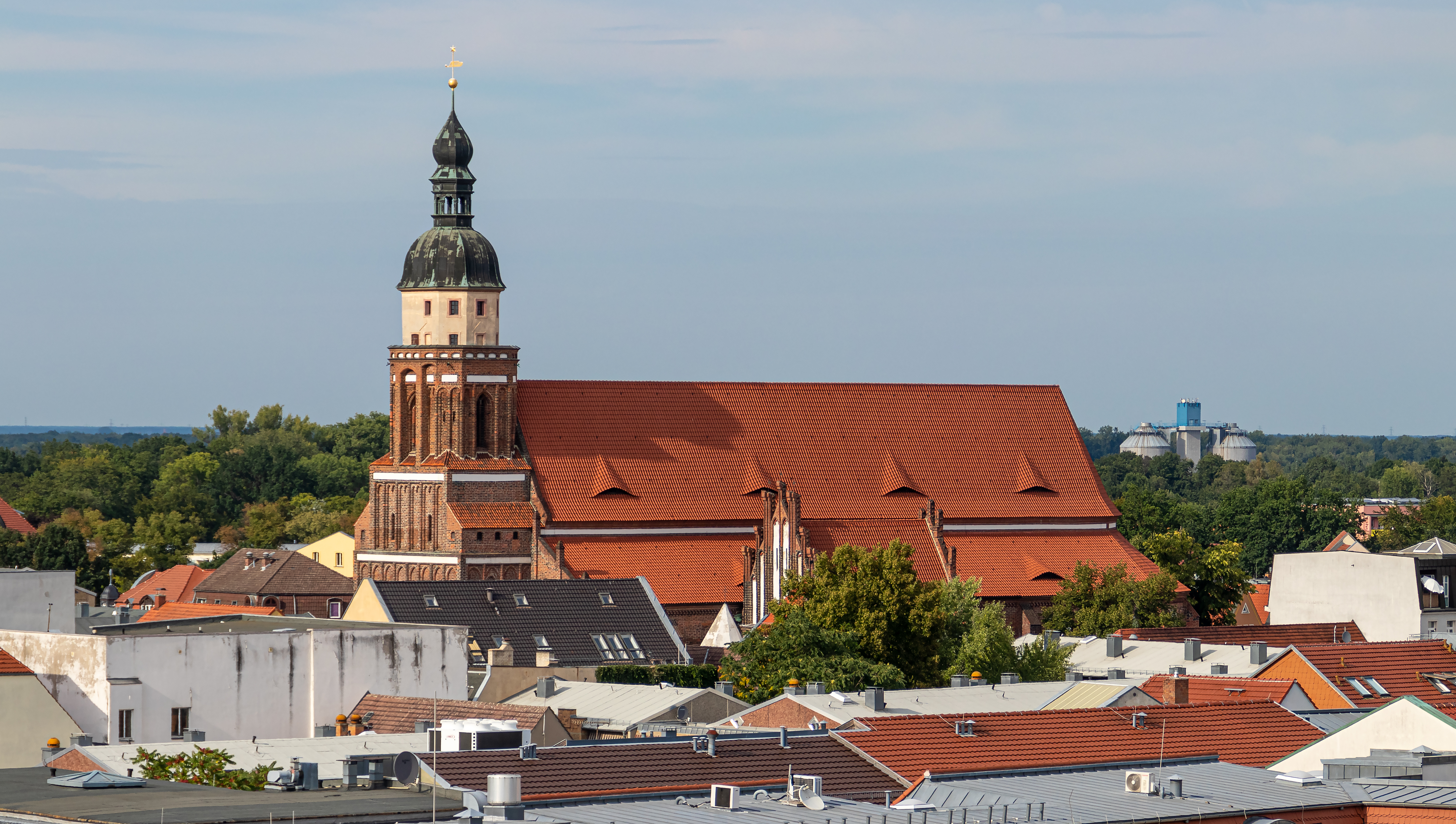
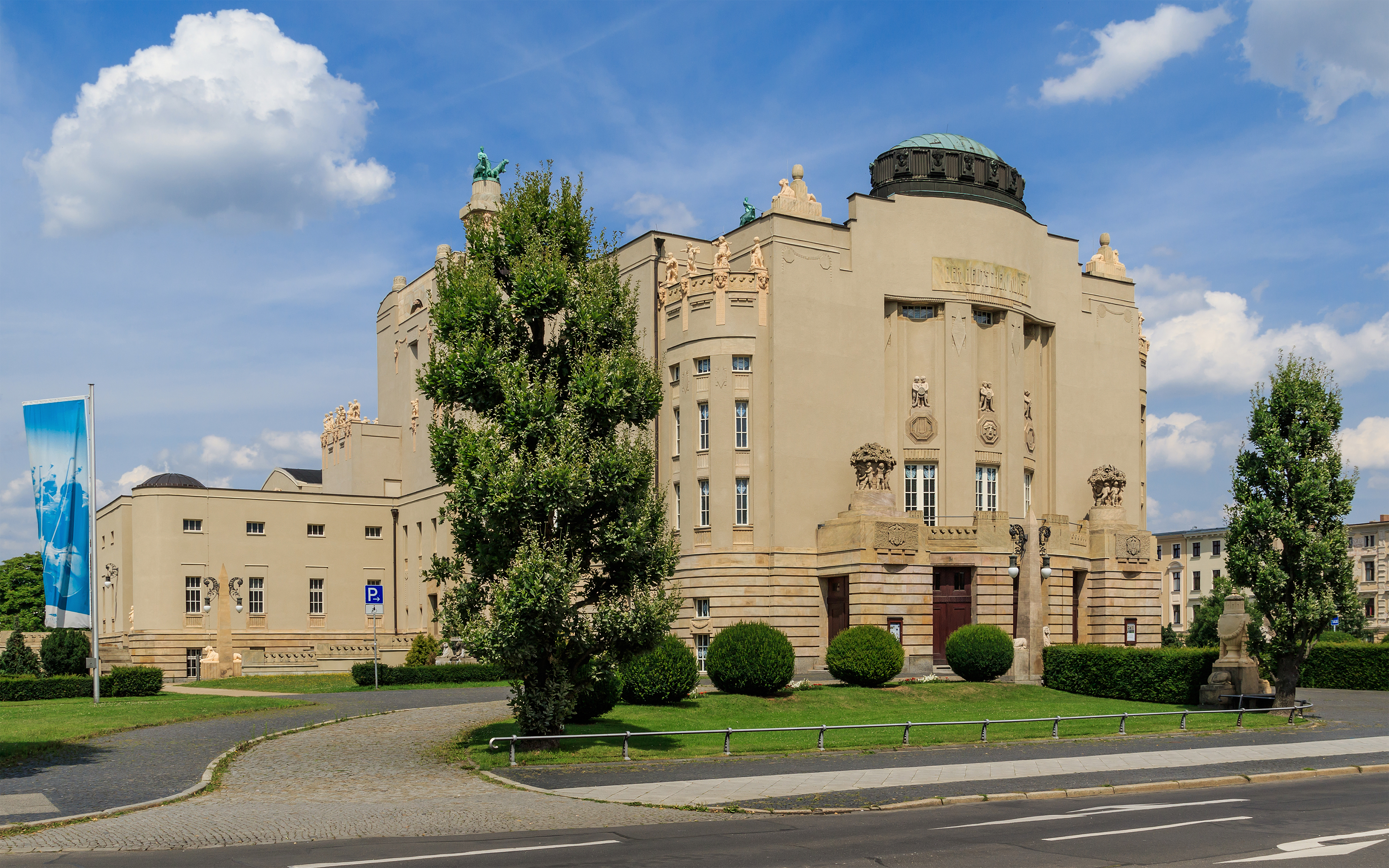
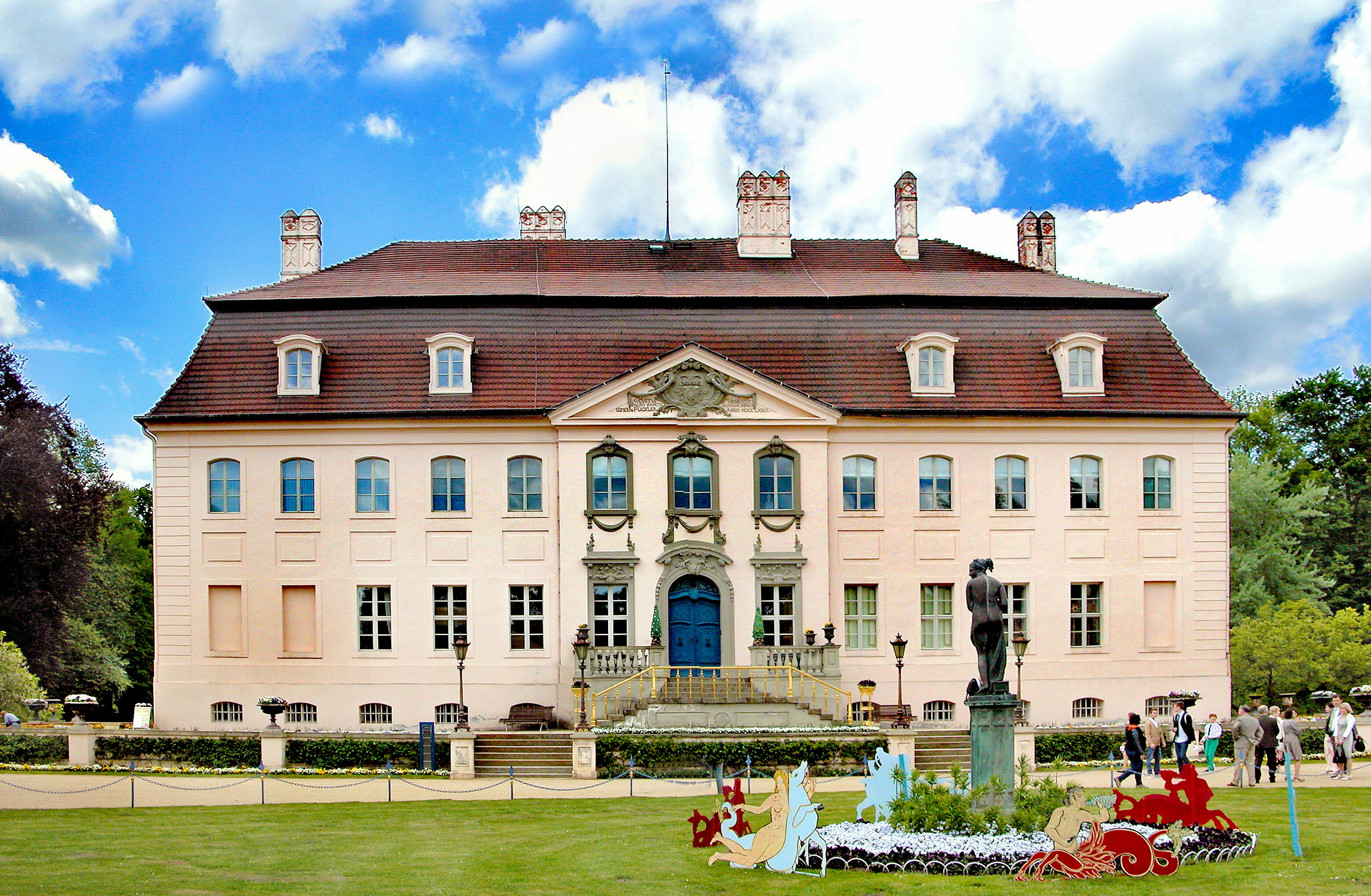
- View over Cottbus St. Nicholas Church Staatstheater Cottbus Altmarkt Branitz Palace

- Flag Coat of arms
- Interactive map of Cottbus; Chóśebuz
- Location within Germany Location within Brandenburg
- Coordinates: 51°45′38″N 14°20′03″E
- Country: Germany
- State: Brandenburg
- District: Urban district

Government
  - Mayor (2022–30): Tobias Schick (SPD)

Area
  - Total: 165.63 km^{2} (63.95 sq mi)
- Elevation: 70 m (230 ft)

Population (2025-12-31)
  - Total: 95,140
  - Density: 574.4/km^{2} (1,488/sq mi)
- Demonym(s): German: Cottbuser; Lower Sorbian: Chóśebuzaŕ (m.), Chóśebuzarka (f.)
- Time zone: UTC+01:00 (CET)
  - Summer (DST): UTC+02:00 (CEST)
- Postal codes: 03042-03055
- Dialling codes: 0355
- Vehicle registration: CB
- Website: www.cottbus.de

Cottbus (German pronunciation: [ˈkɔtbʊs]) or Chóśebuz (Lower Sorbian pronunciation: [ˈxɨɕɛbus]) is a university city and the second-largest city in the German state of Brandenburg after the state capital, Potsdam. With around 100,000 inhabitants, Cottbus is the most populous city in Lusatia. Cottbus lies in the Sorbian settlement area (Serbski sedleński rum) of Lower Lusatia, and is the second-largest city on the River Spree after Berlin, which is situated around 125 km (78 mi) downstream. The city is located on the shores of Germany's largest artificial lake, the Cottbuser Ostsee (Chóśebuski pódzajtšny jazor).

Cottbus is the political and cultural center of the Lower Sorbian-speaking Sorbs, also known as the Wends in Lower Lusatia; the overall center of Sorbian culture is Bautzen/Budyšin. Cottbus is the largest bilingual city in Germany. Signage is mostly in German and Lower Sorbian. The city hosts several Lower Sorbian institutions like the Lower Sorbian version of the Sorbischer Rundfunk/Serbski rozgłos, the Lower Sorbian Gymnasium, and the Wendish Museum. The use of the Lower Sorbian language, however, is more widespread in the surrounding municipalities than in the city itself. The Wendish Quarter is a part of the city supposed to resemble the traditional Sorbian architectural style.

Cottbus is the seat of the Brandenburg University of Technology. Due to this, the city has the official names Universitätsstadt Cottbus/Uniwersitne město Chóśebuz (University City Cottbus). Branitz Castle, built in 1770–71, in the southeast of the city, was a residence of the Prince of Pückler-Muskau. The prince, who also created Muskau Park, designed the extensive Branitz Park on the shores of the Spree, with its two grass pyramids. Cottbus State Theater is the only state theater in Brandenburg. Cottbus main station is a major railway junction with extensive sidings/depots.

== Names ==
The placename Cottbus is derived from the Lower Sorbian personal name Chóśebuz, which in turn means "cheerful watchman" or "vigilant hero". The name of the place can thus be interpreted as "settlement of Chóśebud". At its first documented mention in 1156, the spelling was Chotibus; in 1301, the manor was referred to as opidum et castrum Kotebuz. In documents from 1348 and 1386, the town appears as Kothebus. The spelling Kottbus first appears in 1391.

Until the beginning of the 20th century, the spelling of the city's name was disputed. In Berlin, the spelling "Kottbus" was preferred, and it is still used for the capital's Kottbusser Tor ("Cottbus Gate"). Locally, the traditional spelling "Cottbus" (which defies standard German-language rules) was preferred, and it is now used in most circumstances. Because the official spelling used locally before the spelling reforms of 1996 had contravened even the standardized spelling rules already in place, the Standing Committee for Geographical Names stressed the urgent recommendation that geographical names should respect the national spelling standards.

A citizen of the city may be identified as either a "Cottbuser" or a "Cottbusser".

According to the city's main statutes, its official name is Cottbus/Chóśebuz. In addition to its name, it also carries the designation "University City" (Universitätsstadt / Uniwersitne město).

Names in different languages:

- Czech: Chotěbuz, pronounced [ˈxocɛbus]
- German: Cottbus
- Latin: Cotbusium
- Lower Sorbian: Chóśebuz
- Polish: Chociebuż, pronounced [xɔˈt͡ɕɛbuʂ]
- Upper Sorbian: Choćebuz
- Yiddish: קוטבוס, romanized: Kotbus

== History ==
=== Medieval period ===
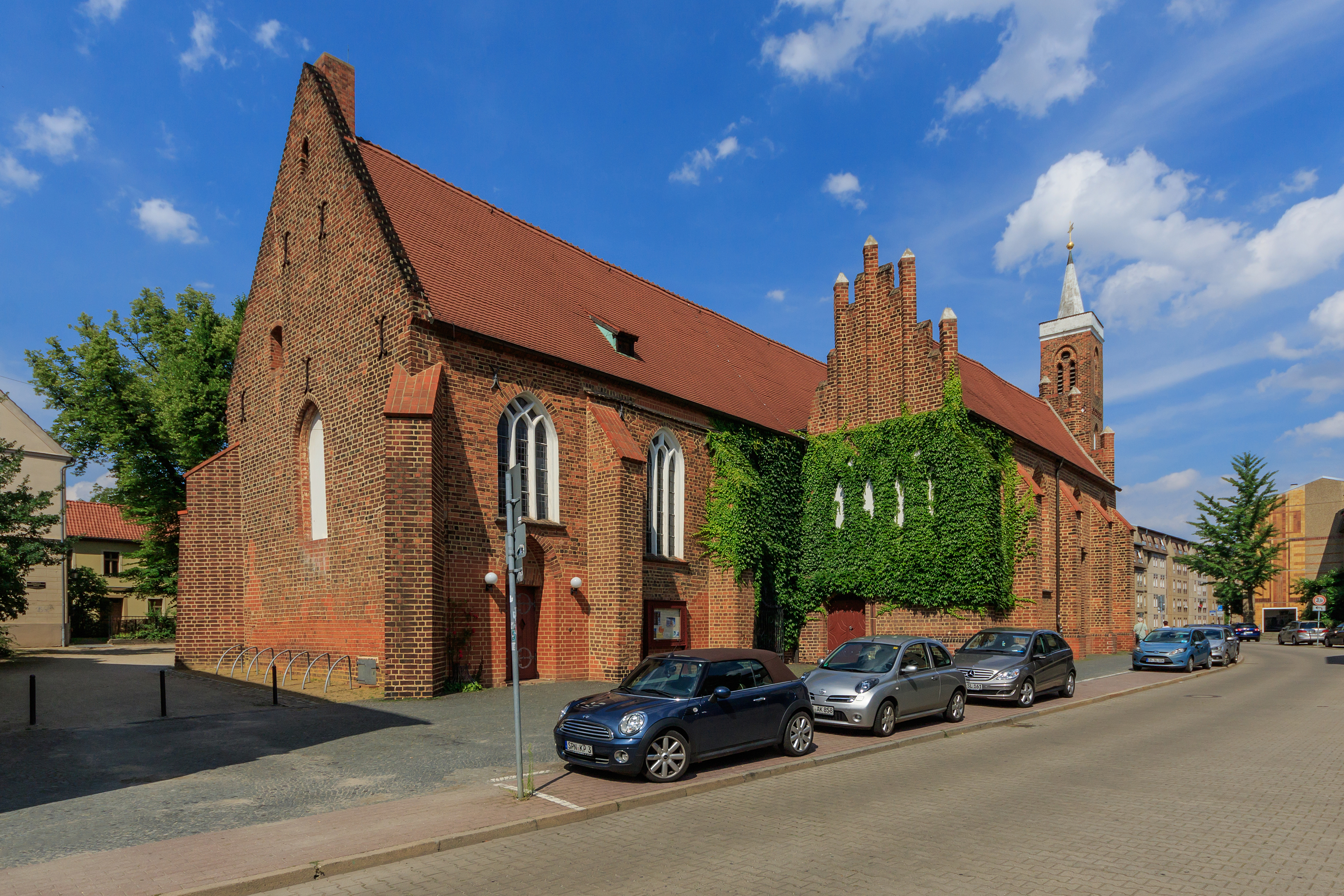
Gothic Franciscan church and later Sorbian Protestant Church

The settlement was established in the tenth century, when Sorbs erected a castle on a sandy island in the River Spree. It was captured by the March of Lusatia in 965, then it passed to Poland under Bolesław I the Brave in 1002. During the German–Polish War of 1003–1005, near Chociebuż, the Veleti joined the allied forces of the Holy Roman Empire, Bavaria and Bohemia to jointly attack Poland. During the German–Polish War of 1015–1018, it was an important defensive stronghold of Poland against the Germans, and it was further reinforced from the west by additional field fortifications. It passed again to the March of Lusatia in 1032.

The first recorded mention of the town's name was in 1156. In the 13th century German settlers came to the town and thereafter lived side by side with the Sorbs. In the Middle Ages Cottbus was known for wool, and the town's drapery was exported throughout Brandenburg, Bohemia and Saxony. It was also located on an important trade route, called the "Salt Road", which was used to transport salt from Halle to Lusatia and further east to Poland. It was part of the Margraviate of Lusatia and later Lower Lusatia, which was held by the House of Wettin until it became a Bohemian Crown Land in 1367. In 1445 Cottbus was acquired by the Margraviate of Brandenburg from Bohemia. It was an exclave almost completely surrounded by Bohemian Lower Lusatia (with a short border with the Electorate of Saxony to the south-west).

Historical affiliations

March of Lusatia 965–1002
Duchy of Poland 1002–1025
Kingdom of Poland 1025–1031
Duchy of Poland 1032
March of Lusatia 1032–1367
Bohemian Crown 1367–1445
Margraviate of Brandenburg 1445–1618
Brandenburg-Prussia 1618–1701
Kingdom of Prussia 1701–1807
Kingdom of Saxony 1807–1815
Kingdom of Prussia 1815–1871
German Empire 1871–1918
Weimar Republic 1918–1933
Nazi Germany 1933–1945
Allied-occupied Germany 1945–1949
East Germany 1949–1990
Federal Republic Germany 1990–date

=== Modern period ===
In 1514 Jan Rak founded the Universitas Serborum, a Sorbian gymnasium, in the city. In 1635 Lower Lusatia was ceded by Bohemia to Saxony, thereby making Cottbus an enclave of Saxony. Since the 1690s, French, Walloons and Palatines settled in the city. In 1701 Brandenburg-Prussia became the Kingdom of Prussia.

In 1807, following the War of the Fourth Coalition, Cottbus was ceded by Prussia to the Kingdom of Saxony by the Treaty of Tilsit, reuniting it with Lower Lusatia. Cottbus was returned to Prussia by the Congress of Vienna in 1815 after the Napoleonic wars. Lower Lusatia was also ceded to Prussia and both became part of the Prussian Province of Brandenburg (and Regierungsbezirk Frankfurt), where they remained until 1947. In the 19th century, the Bramborski Serbski Casnik Sorbian newspaper was published in the city, and in 1880, the first Lower Lusatian department of the Maćica Serbska organization was established there.

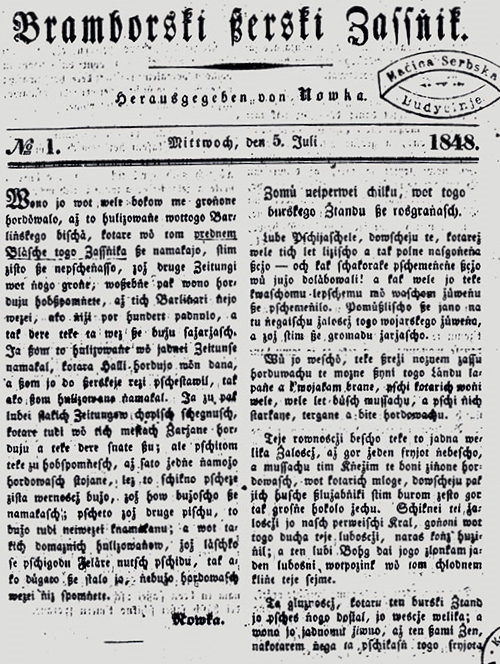
First issue of the Bramborski Serbski Casnik Sorbian newspaper, 1848

Up to 142 French prisoners of war were held in the town by the Prussians during the Franco-Prussian War of 1870–1871. In 1871 Prussia, and therefore Cottbus, became part of the German Empire. According to the Prussian census of 1905, the city of Cottbus had a population of 46,270, of which 97% were Germans, 2% were Sorbs and 1% were Poles.

=== World War I to World War II ===
On 1 August 1914, many citizens of Cottbus greeted the outbreak of the First World War with jubilation. Emergency final examinations were held at the grammar school (Gymnasium), and a few days later Infantry Regiment No. 52 marched to the train station, cheered on by thousands of Cottbus residents.

During World War I, Germany operated two prisoner-of-war camps and a detention center for Allied privates in the city. The first captives, some 7,500 Russians, were mostly kept outdoors, which, combined with poor sanitary and medical conditions, resulted in an epidemic typhus outbreak, with 70% of the prisoners falling ill, and some 400 dying. Soon, also POWs of other nationalities, including French, British, Belgian, Serbian, Romanian, Italian, Portuguese and Australian were held in the POW camps in Cottbus. Conditions in the camps were poor due to overcrowding, filth, inadequate heating in winter, and insufficient medical supplies in the camps' lazarettes. Western Allied POWs were eventually released until mid-January 1919, whereas Russian POWs remained in the camps and were employed at local lignite mines. Many Russian POWs preferred to stay in the camp rather than leave for Soviet Russia and be forced into the Communist Party and army, and many were released to Russia only between September 1920 and January 1921, however some 600 to 1,000 Russians remained in the camp as of June 1921.

The former prisoner-of-war camp was used as a concentration camp for some 1,200 to 1,500 Polish activists, civilians and insurgents of the Silesian Uprisings of 1919–1921, who were often subjected to harassment, beatings and tortures, with their deportation from Upper Silesia to Cottbus being a breach of the Treaty of Versailles. Among the prisoners were dozens of women with children, and elderly men, and camp conditions remained poor. It was also the site of a concentration camp for unwanted Jewish refugees from Eastern Europe. Since late 1922, also Polish laborers and their families were detained in the camp before their deportation to Poland. The camp was eventually closed in December 1923.

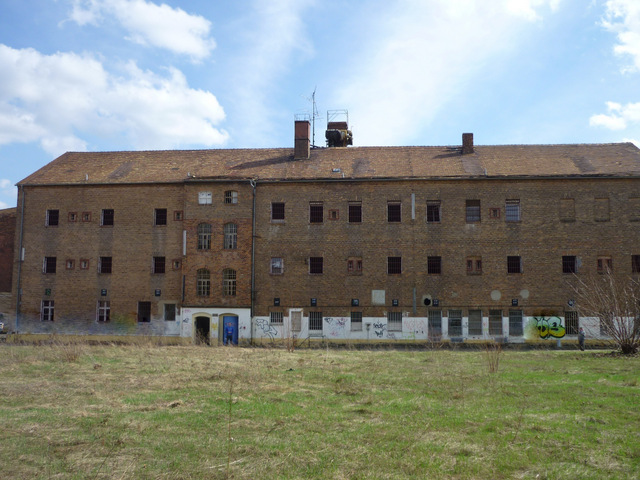
Prison wing of Cottbus Penitentiary

After the First World War, the textile industry continued to dominate the economy, although unemployment was at times high. In the 1932 elections, the NSDAP already won a majority of the votes. In 1934, the "Cottbus gold find" attracted public attention. Between 1934 and 1937, the city received a new town hall, as the old building on the Altmarkt was no longer able to handle the growing administrative workload. During the National Socialist era, the old Prussian prison was first used as a men's prison starting in early 1937, and then as a women's prison from August 1937 onward. In January 1939, the prison was converted into a women's penitentiary (Frauenzuchthaus). During World War II, it had multiple forced labour subcamps located both in the city and other places in the region. From 1938, the Phänomen Works in Zittau produced the ZKW tracked vehicle for the Wehrmacht. In 1939, the Focke-Wulf aircraft works relocated parts of their production to Cottbus. In addition, a German Air Transport School (Deutsche Verkehrsfliegerschule) and a hydrogenation plant (Hydrierwerk) were established. For the antisemitic persecution, see below.

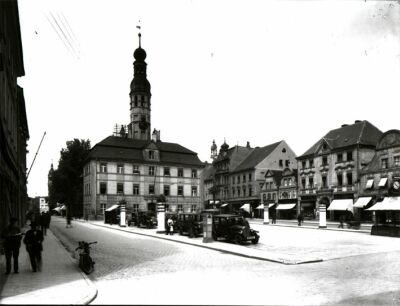
The old town hall on the Altmarkt, destroyed in 1945

In the autumn of 1940, the people of Cottbus experienced the first air raids on the city. Polish actor Władysław Hańcza was imprisoned in a forced labour camp in the city in 1944–1945. On 15 February 1945, a bombing raid by 459 American B-17 bombers destroyed large parts of the city. More than 1,000 people were killed. On 22 April 1945, after three days of heavy fighting, troops of the 1st Ukrainian Front of the Red Army captured the city. Among the buildings destroyed were the historic town hall on the Altmarkt and the station's reception building. Today, about one-third of Cottbus consists of buildings dating from before the Second World War. In January 1946, Cottbus issued 34 semi-postal postage stamps to help finance rebuilding the city.

=== German Democratic Republic ===
After the end of the war, Cottbus belonged to the Soviet Occupation Zone, from which the German Democratic Republic (GDR) emerged in 1949. On 1 July 1950, Cottbus was incorporated into the district (Landkreis) of Cottbus, thereby losing its status as an independent city. In 1952, Cottbus became the capital of the newly established GDR district (Bezirk) of Cottbus. On 17 June 1953, Cottbus also experienced the popular uprising. When restrictions on living standards were to be implemented, people took to the streets and also raised political demands. Soviet tanks and workers' militias suppressed the uprising.

In 1954, Cottbus once again became an independent city, and the surrounding district was renamed Cottbus-Land. That same year, the University of Civil Engineering (Hochschule für Bauwesen) was founded. It was initially closed in 1963 and re-established in 1969 as the University of Civil Engineering (Ingenieurhochschule für Bauwesen).

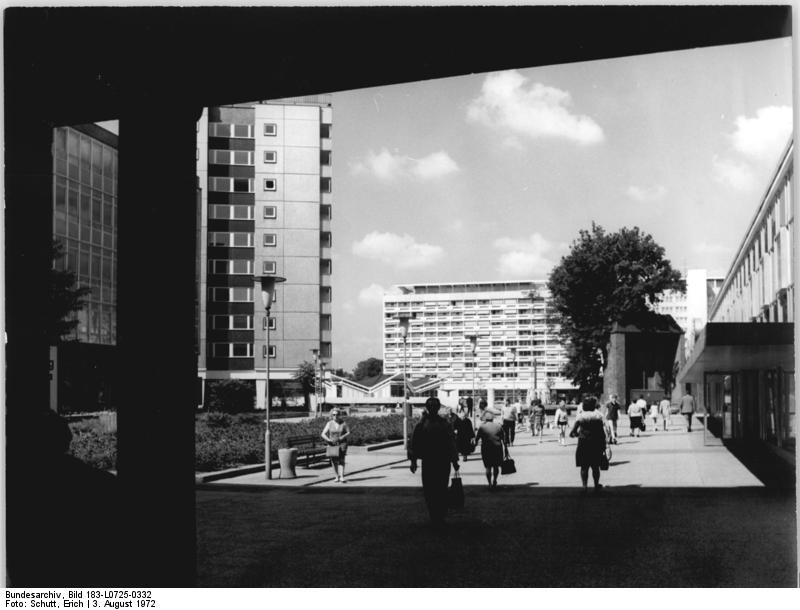
The city promenade, planned as the new city center, in 1972

In 1952, the Socialist Unity Party (SED) declared that the Cottbus district was to be developed into the coal and energy district of the GDR. The area around the city subsequently became the most important supplier of coal and energy. However, construction—led by the Construction and Assembly Combine (Bau- und Montagekombinat)—as well as the textile and furniture industries and food production also shaped the city's economic structure. The first prefabricated housing buildings (Plattenbau) were built in the late 1950s in the Spremberg suburb. Between 1968 and 1970, immediately west of the old town, the city promenade was constructed, with its nearly 175-meter-long "residential slab" (Wohnscheibe Stadtpromenade), which was urbanistically designed as the new city center. On 14 January 1975, a MiG-21 fighter jet crashed into a residential block in Cottbus. The pilot and five female residents died instantly; another resident died later.

On 17 September 1975, construction began on the large housing estate of Sachsendorf-Madlow, between the villages of Sachsendorf and Madlow, which had since been incorporated into Cottbus. The apartment blocks were mostly of the prefabricated P2 type. The first apartments were ready for occupancy in January 1976; in total, 12,500 new apartments were built. On September 4, 1976, the population of Cottbus exceeded 100,000, making it a major city (Großstadt). The last large housing estate to be built was the Neu-Schmellwitz district, starting in 1983, with prefabricated WBS 70 apartment blocks, mainly intended for employees of the nearby textile combine. Immediately before reunification, in 1989, the city reached its highest population level, with 128,943 inhabitants.

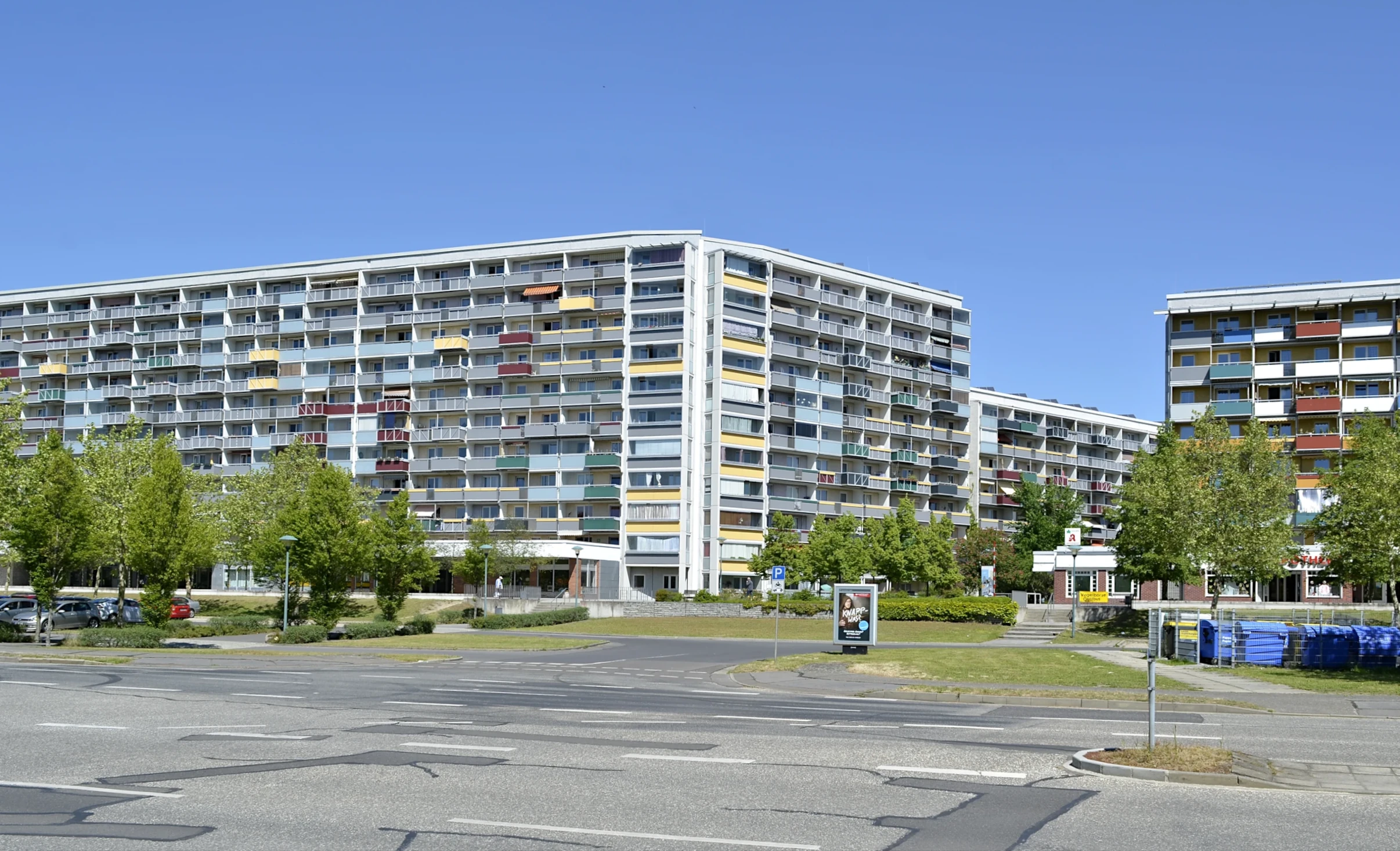
Prefabricated buildings in the large housing estate of Sachsendorf-Madlow, built from 1975 onward

The Cottbus prison (Zuchthaus Cottbus) was a central collection point for political prisoners who were "bought free" by the West German government. Today, the Cottbus Prison Memorial (Gedenkstätte Zuchthaus Cottbus) is located there.

=== Period after reunification ===
With the German reunification in October 1990, the privatization of the economy triggered a profound structural transformation in the city and the region. Cottbus became a center for services, science, and administration. Due to declining population numbers, numerous apartment blocks—particularly in Neu-Schmellwitz and in the southern part of Sachsendorf—were dismantled. As part of the Brandenburg district reform of 1993, the majority of the Cottbus district was incorporated into the newly formed district of Spree-Neiße. Six municipalities from the district were incorporated into Cottbus, while the city itself remained independent of any district (kreisfrei).

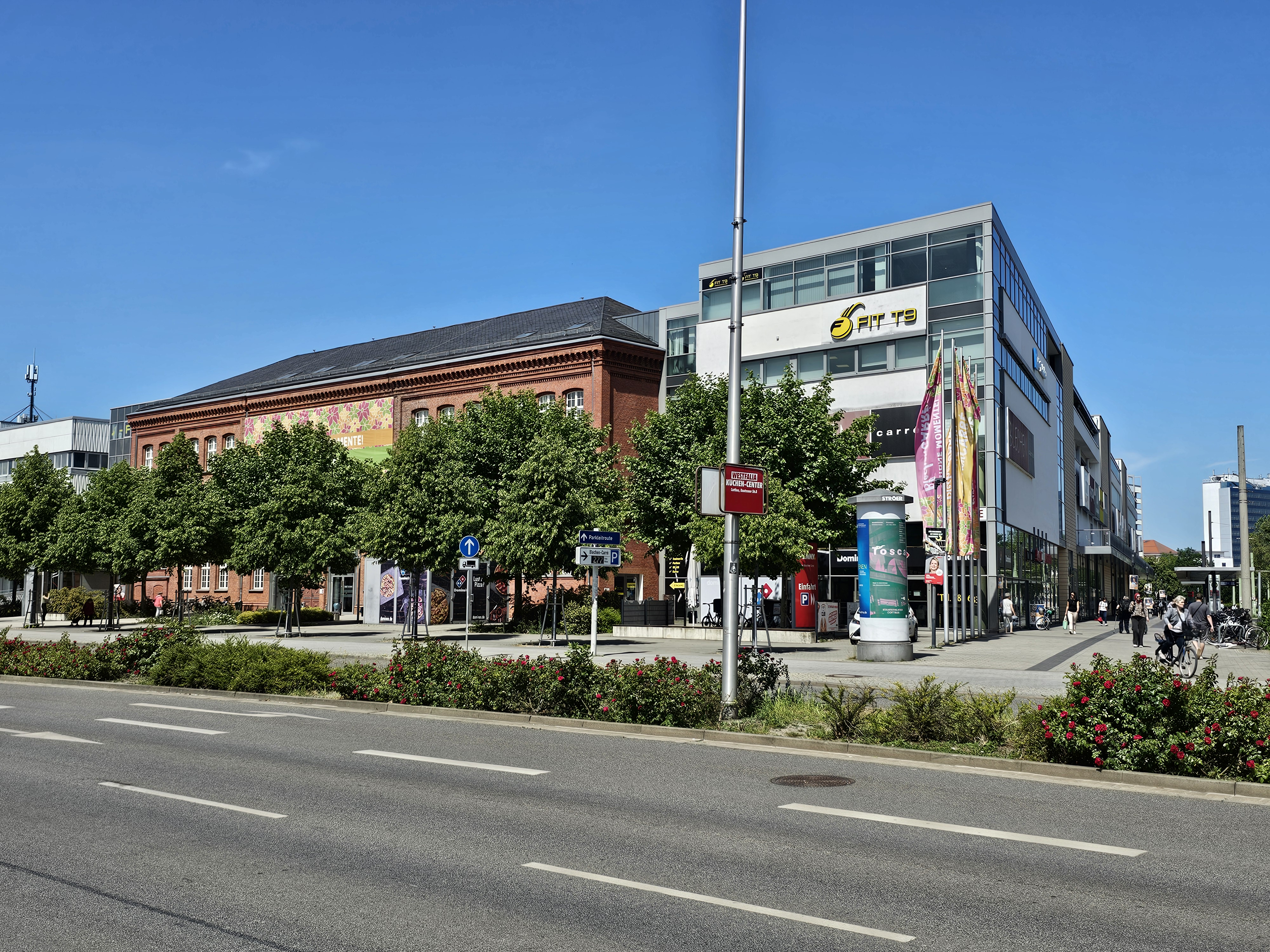
Blechen Carré in 2024

Between April and October 1995, Cottbus hosted the first Federal Garden Show (Bundesgartenschau) to take place in the new federal states. In 2001, the city won gold in the federal competition Our City is Blooming (Unsere Stadt blüht auf). In 2006, the city celebrated the 850th anniversary of its first documented mention. Since 1 January 2007, Cottbus has been the seat of the Berlin-Brandenburg Finance Court. Between 2006 and 2008, large parts of the city promenade were redesigned. Among other things, the pedestrian bridge, sales pavilions, and the Kosmos ice cream bar were demolished—partly amid public protests. On 26 September 2008, the southern section saw the opening of the Blechen Carré shopping center, constructed incorporating the former Bürger-Töchterschule (Citizens' Daughters' School); the northern section has since remained a vacant lot.

As part of the planned 2019 administrative structure reform in Brandenburg, the city of Cottbus was to lose its independent district status and, according to an initial draft by the state government, merge with the districts of Elbe-Elster, Oberspreewald-Lausitz, and Spree-Neiße to form a new district of Lower Lusatia (Niederlausitz). In July 2017, a revised bill was presented, proposing a merger of Cottbus with the district of Spree-Neiße into a new district called Cottbus-Spree-Neiße. The state government's plans met with strong resistance at the municipal level. Among other things, the city administration of Cottbus had already produced a position paper in October 2015 advocating for the preservation of its independent status. Since the district councils of other Brandenburg districts also positioned themselves against the reform, and due to disagreements within the state government, the plans were abandoned in November 2017.

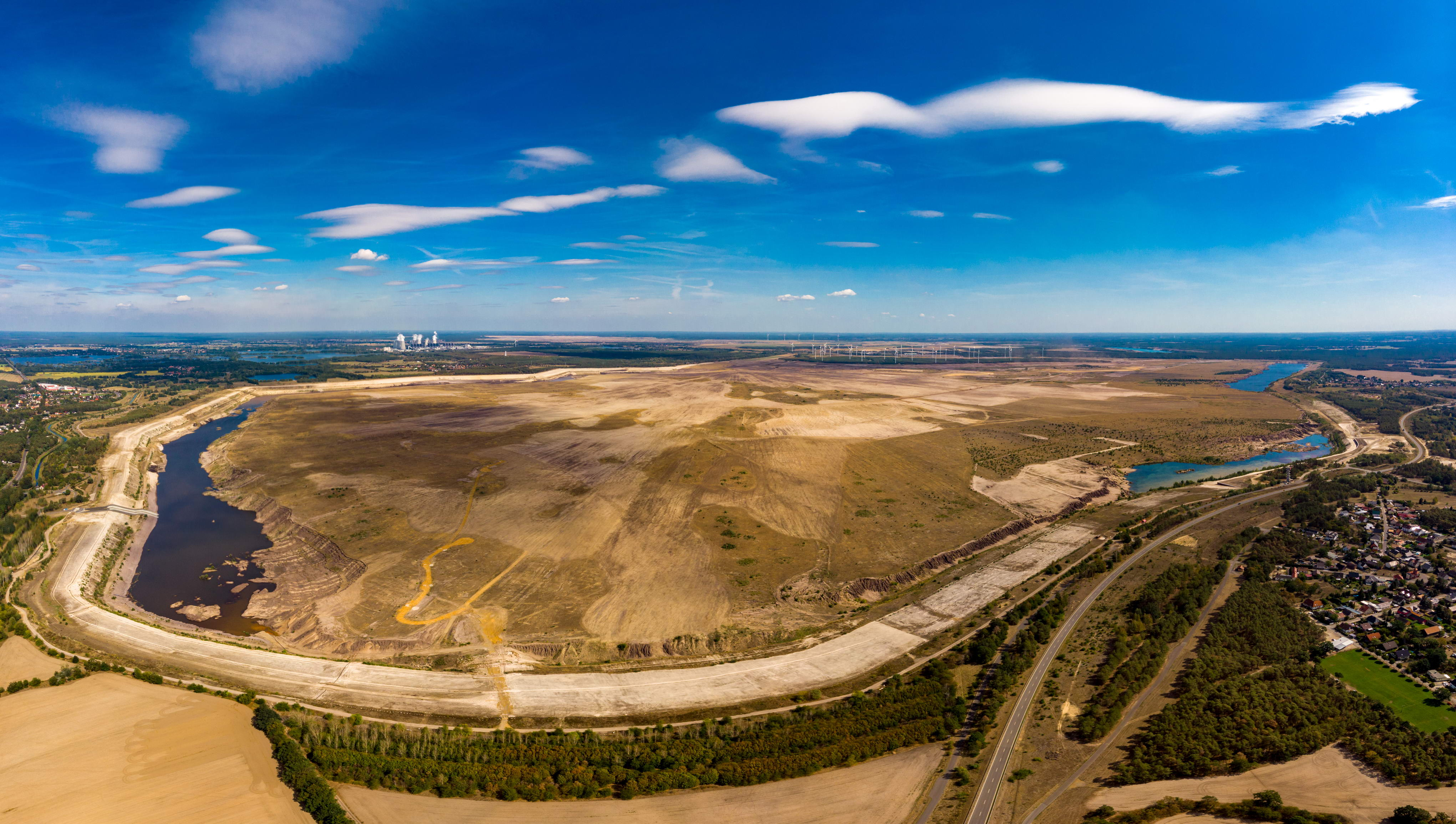
Cottbus Eastern Lake

With the planned coal phase-out, the city of Cottbus and the surrounding region have been increasingly affected by structural change. The Cottbus-Nord lignite opencast mine in the eastern part of the city was closed in December 2015 and has since been undergoing recultivation with the aim of future tourist use. From April 2019 to the end of 2024, the residual mining pit was flooded, creating the Cottbus Eastern Lake (Cottbuser Ostsee), the largest artificial lake in Germany by area. In January 2024, an ICE maintenance facility of Deutsche Bahn was opened northwest of the railway station grounds.

== Boroughs ==

	German	Lower Sorbian	Inhabitants	Surface area (km^{2})	Population density	First mention	Incorporation
1	Mitte (de)	Srjejź	10,732	1.7	6,313		
2	Schmellwitz (de)	Chmjelow	14,116	8.1	1,743	1414	1950
3	Sandow (de)	Žandow	15,301	8.7	1,759	1415	1905
4	Spremberger Vorstadt (de)	Grodkojske pśedměsto	13,800	3.6	3,833		
5	Ströbitz (de)	Strobice	15,726	11.7	1,344	1452	1950
6	Sielow (de)	Žylow	3,510	18.8	187	1300	1993
7	Saspow (de)	Zaspy	686	4.3	160	1455	1950
8	Merzdorf (de)	Žylowk	1,089	7.4	147	1411	1993
9	Dissenchen (de)	Dešank	1,101	30.7	36	1536	1993
10	Branitz (de)	Rogeńc	1,446	5.4	268	1449	1993
11	Madlow (de)	Módłej	1,630	3.0	543	1346	1950
12	Sachsendorf (de)	Knorawa	10,584	6.6	1,603	1779	1950
13	Döbbrick (de)	Depsk	1,695	15.5	109	1551	1993
14	Skadow (de)	Škódow	568	4.6	123	1407	1993
15	Willmersdorf (de)	Rogozno	633	6.4	99	1449	1993
16	Kahren (de)	Kórjeń	1,259	14.0	90	1300	1993
17	Kiekebusch (de)	Kibuš	1,292	3.7	349	1427	2003
18	Gallinchen (de)	Gołynk	2,768	5.5	503	1421	2003
19	Groß Gaglow (de)	Gogolow	1,487	4.6	323	1389	2003
	Cottbus	Chóśebuz	99,423	164.3	605	1156	

== Demography ==
The population development of Cottbus has been subject to strong fluctuations. The variations in population between the 14th and 17th centuries were the result of the plague. On 4 September 1976, the population of Cottbus exceeded 100,000, making it a major city (Großstadt). In just 13 years, by 1989, it reached its historic peak—primarily due to the lignite mining combine—of 128,943 inhabitants. Within the city boundaries as defined since 2003, the total population at that time would have been 137,366.

Since the peaceful revolution in the GDR, the city lost around 46,000 inhabitants between 1990 and 2007 due to outward migration and declining birth rates. There were more deaths than births and more people moving away than moving in. The status of a major city with over 100,000 inhabitants could be maintained in the first 13 years after reunification only through the incorporation of about 17,000 residents from surrounding areas. As a result of the 2011 census, the population was given as 99,984 on 9 May 2011, and Cottbus lost its major city status, which it regained only briefly thereafter. In 2019, the population again fell below the 100,000 threshold.

According to the population figure based on the 2011 census, the city of Cottbus narrowly surpassed the major city threshold again on 31 December 2023, with 100,010 inhabitants. However, according to the 2022 census in Germany, this number was revised down to 94,778, meaning Cottbus again lost its major city status. The city's registration office reported a population of 99,968 for the same date. For 31 December 2024, the registration office determined a population of 100,275—making Cottbus a major city once more—while the population according to a projection from the 2022 census stood at 95,123. The city of Cottbus explains the difference of around 5,000 inhabitants partly by the fact that, at the time of the census, due to the COVID-19 pandemic in Germany, non-local students registered in Cottbus were not counted, and has lodged an objection to the census result.

As a result of the population decline and the expansion of the city area, the population density dropped significantly. While it stood at 720 people per square kilometer on 31 December 2000, by 31 December 2020, it was 598 people per square kilometer.

The proportion of foreigners (residents without German citizenship) was 2.8 percent at the end of 2000 and 9.1 percent in 2021, amounting to around 9,000 people in 2021. In 2011, 6.1% of Cottbus residents had a migration background.

The most populous districts, each with more than 10,000 residents, are Sandow, Ströbitz, Schmellwitz, the Spremberger Vorstadt, and Sachsendorf. The least populous districts, each with fewer than 1,000 residents, are Skadow, Saspow, and Willmersdorf. In 1991, the average age of the city's population was 35.5 years. By 2000, it had risen to 40.9 years, and by 2011 to 45.7 years. At the end of 2018, the average age was 46.2 years; the "youngest" district was Ströbitz at 41.7 years, while the district with the highest average age was Madlow at 53.1 years. On 31 December 2019, 14.5 percent of the population of Cottbus was younger than 18 years, 30.9 percent were between 18 and 44 years old, 28.4 percent were between 45 and 65 years old, and 26.1 percent were older than 65 years.

Development of population since 1875 within the current boundaries (blue line: population; dotted line: comparison to population development in Brandenburg state; grey background: time of Nazi Germany; red background: time of communist East Germany)

Recent population development and projections (population development before 2011 census (blue line); recent population development according to the Census in Germany in 2011 and 2022 (blue bordered line); official projection for 2024-2040 in three variants (dotted lines 2025-2040)

Cottbus: Population development
within the current boundaries (2025)

Year	Pop.	±% p.a.
1875	35,201	—
1890	46,671	+1.90%
1910	65,438	+1.70%
1925	68,228	+0.28%
1933	72,286	+0.72%
1939	75,969	+0.83%
1946	73,010	−0.57%

Year	Pop.	±% p.a.
1950	73,695	+0.23%
1964	84,952	+1.02%
1971	94,606	+1.55%
1981	125,326	+2.85%
1985	133,232	+1.54%
1990	134,781	+0.23%
1995	126,343	−1.28%

Year	Pop.	±% p.a.
2000	113,618	−2.10%
2005	105,309	−1.51%
2010	102,091	−0.62%
2015	99,687	−0.48%
2020	98,693	−0.20%
2025	95,140	−0.73%

== Religion ==
=== Religious affiliation statistics ===
According to the 2011 census, 11.2% of the inhabitants were Protestant, 3.5% Roman Catholic, and the majority—85.3%—were non-denominational, belonged to another religious community, or gave no information. The number of Protestants has continued to decline since then. At the end of 2017, Cottbus had 100,945 inhabitants, of whom 9.7% were Protestant, 3.5% Catholic, and 86.8% either had another or no religious affiliation. The proportion of Protestants and Catholics in the total population has continued to decrease since then. According to the 2022 census (15 May 2022), 8.9% of the inhabitants were Protestant, 3.2% Catholic, and 87.9% were non-denominational, belonged to another religious community, or gave no information.

The number of Muslims living in Cottbus was estimated at 4.1% (4,100) in 2023. In January 2025, almost 2,700 people with Syrian and nearly 900 with Afghan citizenship lived in Cottbus.

==== Christianity ====
The Christianization of Lusatia was carried out from Meissen and was completed around the year 1100. Bishop Eido of Rochlitz was able to preach successfully in Lower Lusatia during his missions from 992 to 1015 thanks to his knowledge of Slavic languages, and under Benno of Meissen the mission continued successfully from 1058. Thus, the city of Cottbus initially belonged to the Diocese of Meissen. Due to the great distance from sparsely populated Lower Lusatia to Saxon Meissen, an official representative of the bishop (an Offizial) was based in Lübben. Cottbus was the seat of an archpriest.

There are a number of ecumenical events in Cottbus. For example, for several years now, the Night of the Open Churches (Nacht der offenen Kirchen, NdoK) has been organized in cooperation between various churches.

==== Protestant ====
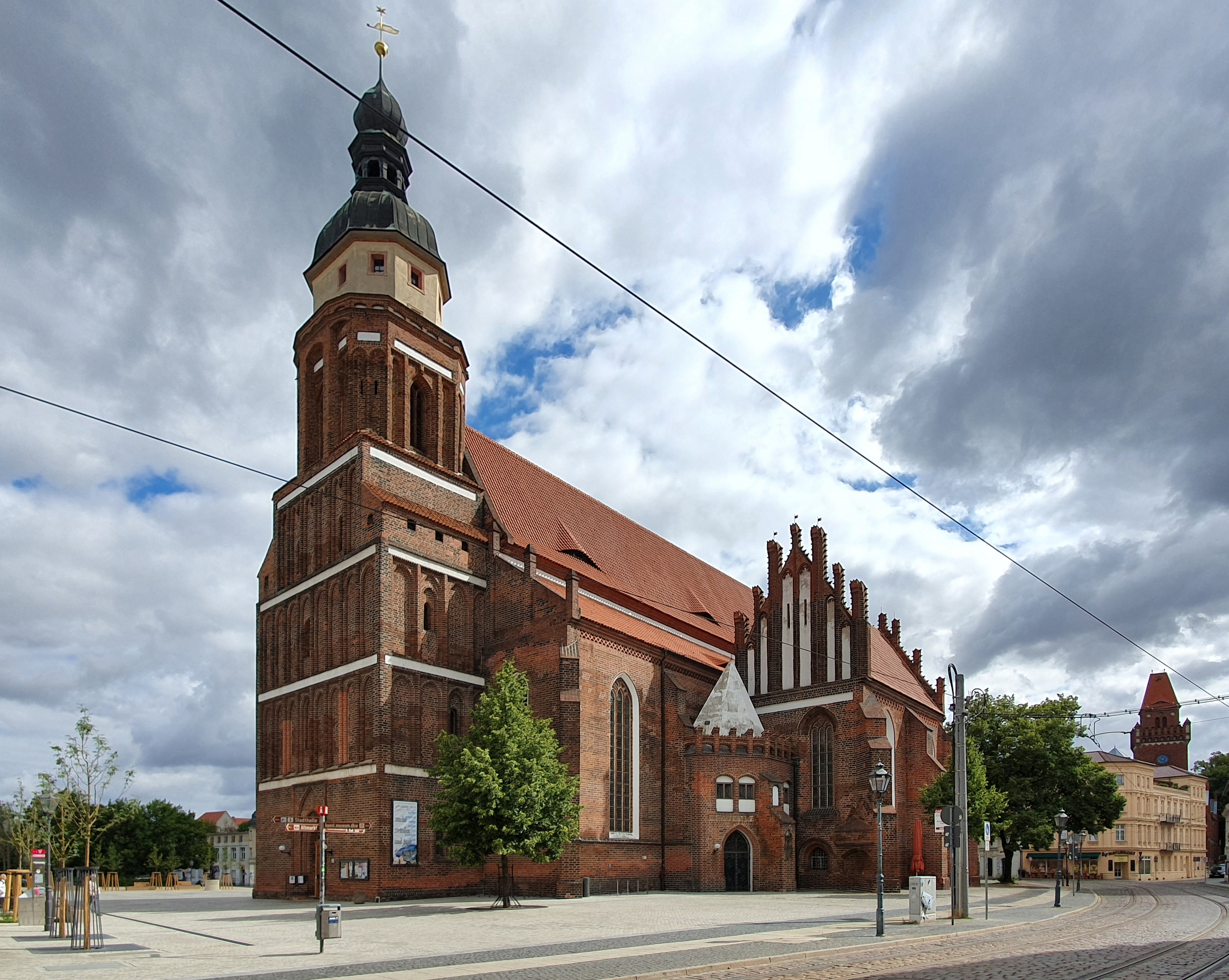
Upper Church of St. Nicholas

After the end of the system of princely church rule in 1918, the Provincial Church of Brandenburg became a founding member of the Evangelical Church of the Old Prussian Union. In 1947, it became an independent regional church with a bishop at its head. In 2004, the church merged with the Evangelical Church of Silesian Upper Lusatia to form the Evangelical Church in Berlin-Brandenburg–Silesian Upper Lusatia. The Protestant parishes of Cottbus—unless they are free churches—belong to the Cottbus church district within the church administrative district (ACK) of the same name, which is also based in Cottbus. The Old Lutherans remain present in the city with a parish office and the Kreuzkirche. Today, the Evangelical-Lutheran Kreuzkirche congregation belongs to the Lausitz district of the Independent Evangelical-Lutheran Church.

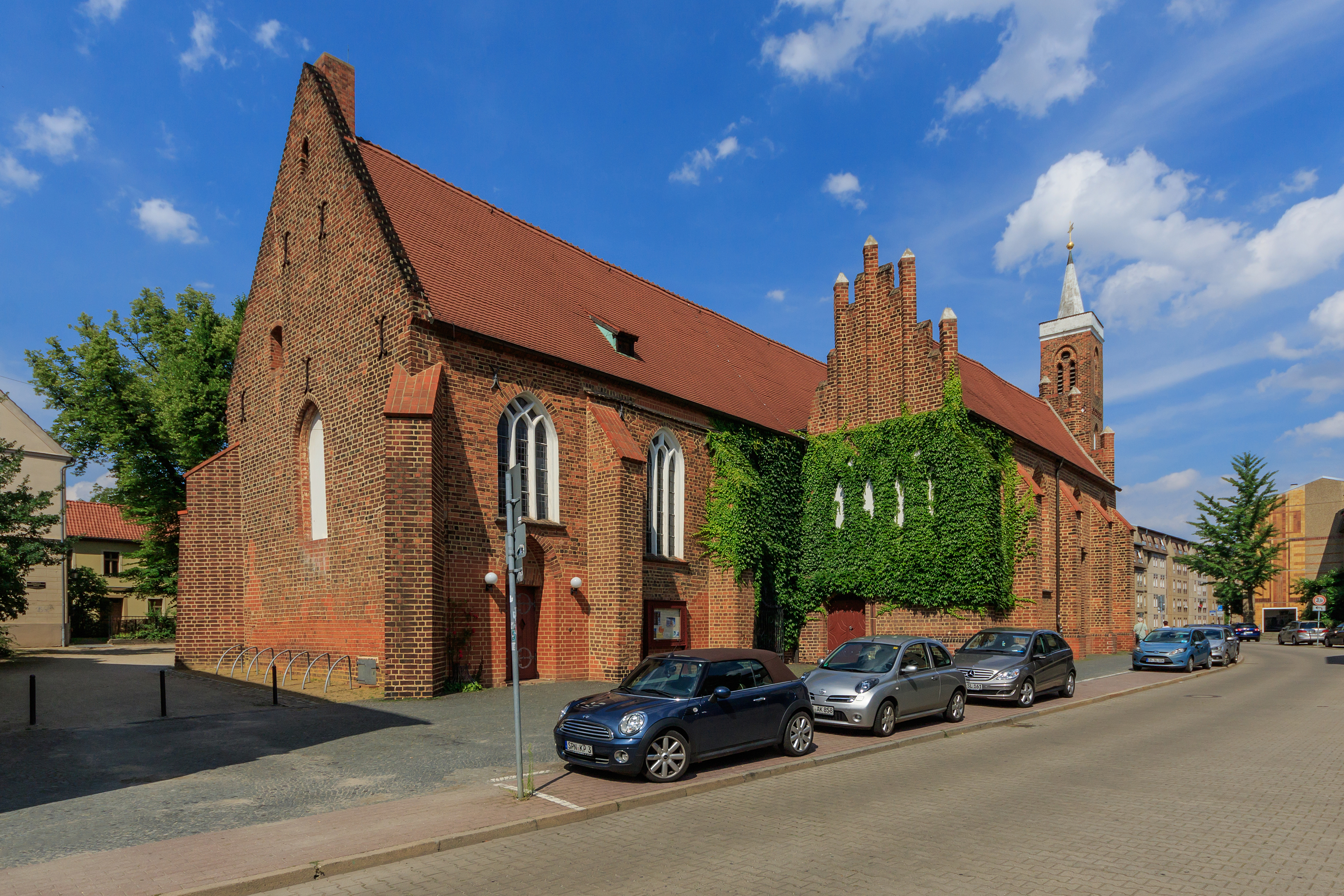
Klosterkirche

In addition to the regional church congregations, there are several free churches in Cottbus, such as an Evangelical Free Church congregation (Baptists), a United Methodist Church, the Apostolic Community, the Biblical Faith Community Cottbus e.V., and the Free Christian Church of Sachsendorf. Since 2001, the Moravian Church (Unitas Fratrum) has again had a house in Cottbus called "Haltestelle Cottbus". The "Church for Cottbus" is currently in formation, an initiative of the FeG Inland-Mission within the Federation of Free Evangelical Churches in Germany.

Places of worship available to Protestant believers today include, among others, the Oberkirche St. Nikolai, the Klosterkirche, the Lutherkirche, and the Martinskirche in Madlow. The Schlosskirche was repurposed in 2014.

==== Roman Catholic ====
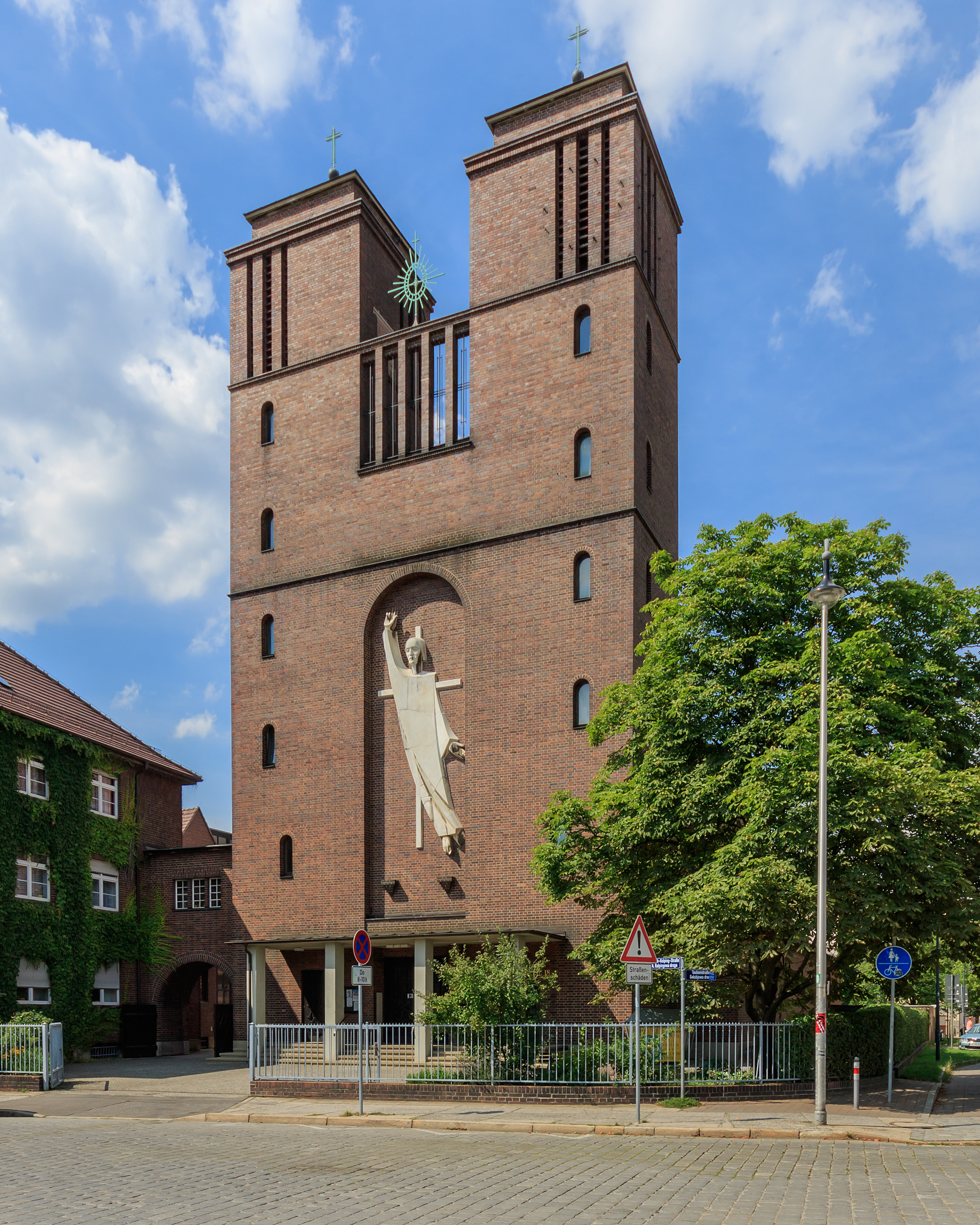
Provost and Parish Church of St. Mary Queen of Peace

After several petitions to the relevant state and church authorities, the foundation stone of today's Christ Church (Christuskirche) was laid in 1848 for the growing number of Catholics, and the church—dedicated to the Good Shepherd (Zum Guten Hirten)—was consecrated on 27 October 1850. Particularly due to industrialization, the number of Catholics soon grew to over 2,500, and for this enlarged congregation a new church was consecrated on 7 October 1934, by Cardinal Adolf Bertram of Breslau under the, for the time, well-chosen patronage of St. Mary Queen of Peace (St. Maria Friedenskönigin). In 1964, the war-damaged "Zum Guten Hirten" church was restored, and a second Cottbus parish formed around the so-called Christ Church. Since 2012, both parishes have been reunited under the old title "Zum Guten Hirten". The parish today belongs to the Diocese of Görlitz.

For Roman Catholic Christians, the Christ Church (Zum Guten Hirten), the Edith Stein Church, and the Provost and Parish Church of St. Mary Queen of Peace are available as places of worship.

To support the population's educational and medical needs on a non-denominational basis, the socially active Catholic order Poor Handmaids of Jesus Christ (Arme Dienstmägde Jesu Christi, also known as the Dernbach Sisters) from Dernbach in the Westerwald settled in Cottbus on 1 December 1886. Their work in outpatient nursing, kindergarten, and retirement home care lasted until 1 May 1965.

==== Union of Evangelical Free Churches ====
The Union of Evangelical Free Churches (VEF) is represented in Cottbus by three congregations: the Seventh-day Adventist congregation with its community center at Gaglower Straße 13, the Evangelical Methodist Church at Virchowstraße 41, and the Evangelical Free Church (Baptists) with its church at Bautzener Straße 111.

==== Other Christian churches and religious communities ====
The New Apostolic Church, the Church of Jesus Christ of Latter-day Saints (Mormons), and Jehovah's Witnesses are also present in Cottbus.

==== Judaism ====
The earliest record of Jews in Cottbus dates from 1448, when Frederick II (1413–1471) granted them the right to reside in the city and placed them under his protection. In 1510, all Jews had to leave Cottbus following the alleged "host desecration" of Knoblauch.

It was not until 1692 that the first recorded request for the settlement of a Jewish family in Cottbus appeared; in 1740, Jewish citizens were again mentioned. In 1811, a prayer room was first documented in the back building of a cloth maker's house on Mauerstraße. In 1814, only 17 Jews lived in Cottbus. After 1816, when Cottbus became part of Prussia—where the Edict of Emancipation for Jews had been in effect since 1812—the Jewish community slowly grew. In 1847, the Jews of the city and surrounding area resolved to form a Jewish community, which was officially recognized in 1858. In 1866, it had 31 members; by 1902, there were 90.

In 1933, the systematic disenfranchisement, discrimination, persecution, and extermination of Jewish citizens by the National Socialists began. That year alone, 315 laws and decrees were passed against them. Also in 1933, the Cottbus VI local police department was established, solely responsible for so-called "Jewish affairs".

On 31 March 1933, a Cottbus newspaper published a boycott call affecting not only grocery stores but also all offices of Jewish lawyers, practices of Jewish doctors, and Jewish textile businesses, to take effect from 1 April 1933. Furthermore, numerous naturalizations granted between 1918 and 1933 were revoked. In 1936, 334 Jewish citizens lived in Cottbus, including 87 children, 128 women, and 119 men. By February 1937, there were already 499 Jews in Cottbus, many having fled from surrounding communities in the hope of living more anonymously in a larger city. At the same time, a government-driven wave of emigration was underway, involving payment of the so-called "Reich Flight Tax" along with the forced expropriation of houses, businesses, and factories. On 1 October 1936, 34 Jews emigrated, mainly to South Africa and Brazil.

During the November pogroms of 1938, the National Socialists also burned down the Cottbus synagogue. It was later demolished, and in the 1960s a department store was built on the site. A memorial plaque was placed in 1988 and renewed in 1998 on the forecourt of the city's utility company in Karl-Liebknecht-Straße (Lower Sorbian: K. Liebknechtowa droga) to commemorate the Jewish community and its synagogue. On the night of 9 November, Jewish men were arrested, and by mid-November 1938, the first transport of so-called "Action Jews" had left the city. After the end of the war, only twelve members of the former community were still alive.

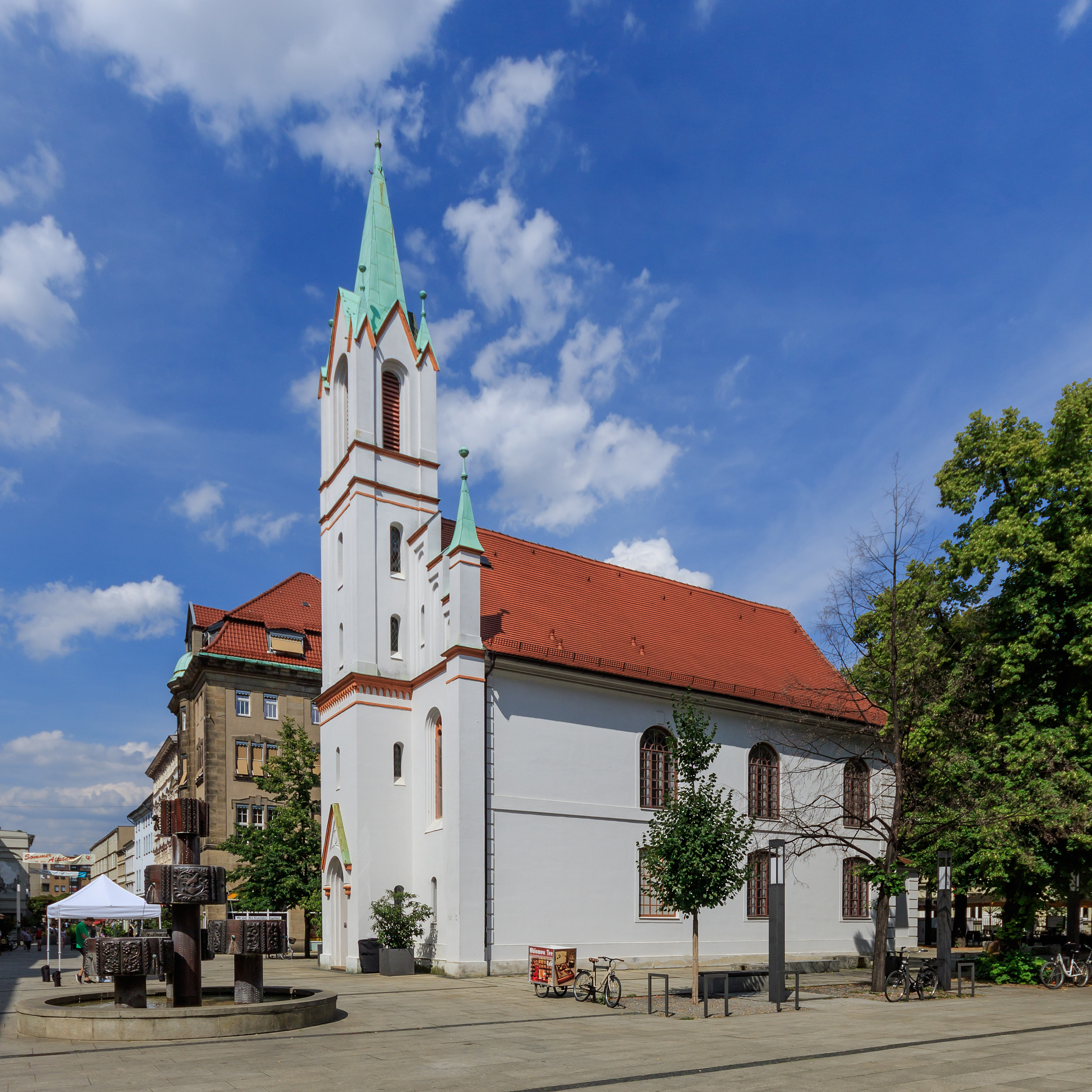
Schlosskirche, Synagogue of the Jewish Community of Cottbus

On 15 July 1998, the Jewish community in Cottbus was reestablished, operating as a non-profit registered association. In the 2010s, it numbered around 350 members, all of whom had come to Germany from the former Soviet Union. Until early 2015, the community lacked a suitable synagogue and sufficient space. On 18 September 2014, the Protestant Schlosskirche was handed over to the Jewish community for conversion into a synagogue. On 27 January 2015, the new synagogue was officially consecrated in the presence of the state rabbi, the vice president of the Central Council of Jews, and about 1,000 citizens.

==== Islam ====
Muslims came to Cottbus/Chóśebuz in larger numbers as students. Since 2000, there has been a Muslim prayer room at the Brandenburg University of Technology Cottbus–Senftenberg. In 2017, the Islamic Community of Cottbus e.V. was founded, among other aims, to establish another prayer room. The number of Muslims living in Cottbus was estimated at 4,100 in 2023.

== Climate ==
Cottbus has an oceanic climate (Köppen Cfb) in spite of being far inland on a relatively high latitude. Summers are very warm for being so far north, while winters are often mild due to prevailing trade winds from the Atlantic Ocean facing little natural obstacles on the way to the area. When wind directions come from elsewhere, hard freezes occasionally take place. As a result, the annual temperature amplitude is quite high for an oceanic climate, ranging from 35 °C (95 °F) in summer to −15 °C (5 °F) in winter. Precipitation is frequent, although usually light in accumulation. Snowfall is a regular occurrence with 36 days of snow cover annually, but Cottbus remains mild enough that it usually thaws quickly. Most of the year is gloomy, with a notable exception in late spring.

Climate data for Cottbus (1991–2020 normals, extremes since 1900)
Month	Jan	Feb	Mar	Apr	May	Jun	Jul	Aug	Sep	Oct	Nov	Dec	Year
Record high °C (°F)	16.6 (61.9)	20.6 (69.1)	25.4 (77.7)	31.2 (88.2)	33.3 (91.9)	39.2 (102.6)	38.9 (102.0)	38.5 (101.3)	34.5 (94.1)	29.2 (84.6)	20.2 (68.4)	17.9 (64.2)	39.2 (102.6)
Mean maximum °C (°F)	11.4 (52.5)	13.2 (55.8)	19.0 (66.2)	25.2 (77.4)	29.1 (84.4)	32.4 (90.3)	33.6 (92.5)	33.4 (92.1)	27.9 (82.2)	22.6 (72.7)	16.0 (60.8)	11.6 (52.9)	35.5 (95.9)
Mean daily maximum °C (°F)	3.5 (38.3)	5.3 (41.5)	9.4 (48.9)	15.7 (60.3)	20.3 (68.5)	23.6 (74.5)	25.6 (78.1)	25.4 (77.7)	20.3 (68.5)	14.4 (57.9)	8.2 (46.8)	4.4 (39.9)	14.7 (58.5)
Daily mean °C (°F)	0.8 (33.4)	1.7 (35.1)	4.8 (40.6)	10.0 (50.0)	14.5 (58.1)	17.9 (64.2)	19.8 (67.6)	19.3 (66.7)	14.6 (58.3)	9.8 (49.6)	5.1 (41.2)	1.9 (35.4)	10.0 (50.0)
Mean daily minimum °C (°F)	−2.1 (28.2)	−1.7 (28.9)	0.4 (32.7)	3.9 (39.0)	8.2 (46.8)	11.8 (53.2)	13.8 (56.8)	13.4 (56.1)	9.4 (48.9)	5.5 (41.9)	1.9 (35.4)	−0.7 (30.7)	5.3 (41.5)
Mean minimum °C (°F)	−12.8 (9.0)	−9.9 (14.2)	−6.7 (19.9)	−3.1 (26.4)	1.5 (34.7)	5.7 (42.3)	8.2 (46.8)	7.5 (45.5)	3.0 (37.4)	−2.1 (28.2)	−5.6 (21.9)	−9.3 (15.3)	−14.8 (5.4)
Record low °C (°F)	−26.6 (−15.9)	−29.5 (−21.1)	−23.0 (−9.4)	−14.2 (6.4)	−3.5 (25.7)	−1.9 (28.6)	4.3 (39.7)	3.2 (37.8)	−2.7 (27.1)	−10.2 (13.6)	−14.4 (6.1)	−25.8 (−14.4)	−29.5 (−21.1)
Average precipitation mm (inches)	41.5 (1.63)	34.1 (1.34)	40.9 (1.61)	30.6 (1.20)	56.6 (2.23)	53.1 (2.09)	74.8 (2.94)	63.0 (2.48)	46.3 (1.82)	40.5 (1.59)	42.9 (1.69)	42.0 (1.65)	566.0 (22.28)
Average precipitation days (≥ 0.1 mm)	17.5	14.5	15.0	11.6	13.1	12.3	13.6	12.9	11.8	13.7	14.6	16.4	167.0
Average relative humidity (%)	83.4	79.7	75.0	66.5	66.4	66.2	67.0	68.8	76.2	81.1	85.1	84.7	75.0
Mean monthly sunshine hours	54.0	77.1	127.1	192.4	227.3	228.0	237.2	227.4	169.0	118.9	62.7	49.1	1,770.3
Source 1: NOAA
Source 2: Infoclimat

== Culture and education ==
=== Theater, stages, and ensembles ===
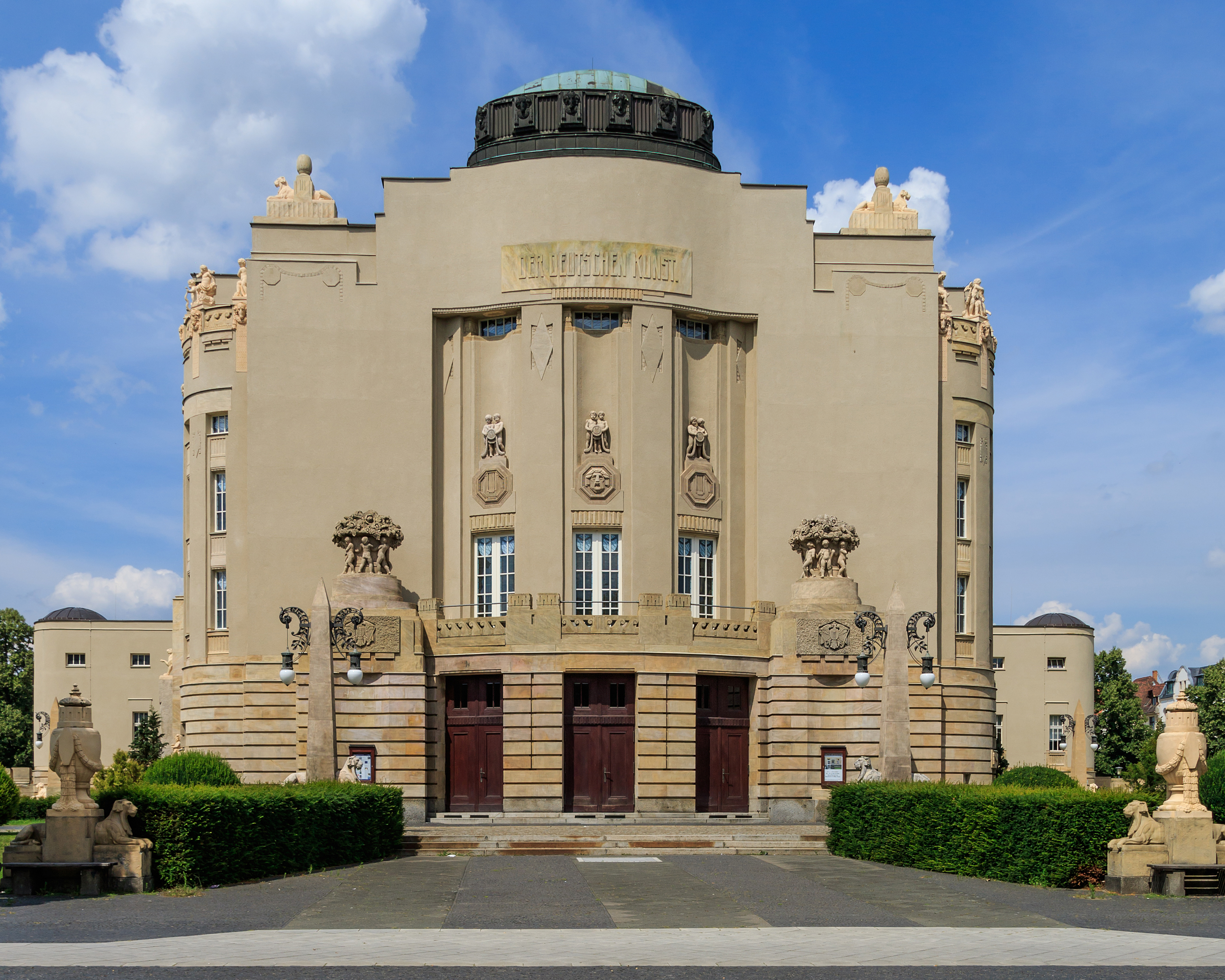
Building of the Staatstheater (State Theatre)

The city of Cottbus has a wide variety of theaters, stages, and ensembles. The most famous is probably the State Theater Cottbus, built to designs by the architect Bernhard Sehring. It is the only state theater in Brandenburg and presents drama, musical theater, and ballet. In addition, the Cottbus City Hall can accommodate around 2,000 people. This venue regularly hosts international ensembles such as the Chinese National Circus, the Russian State Ballet, as well as stars from pop, folk, and schlager music, including Harry Belafonte, Rosenstolz, and Gitte Hænning. The small private theater TheaterNative C, founded in 1989, has become a major presence in the Cottbus arts scene. It offers plays, cabaret, boulevard theater, as well as children's theater and experimental productions. Since 1991, the piccolo Theater has been a theater for children and young people. The audience of the Puppenbühne Regenbogen puppet stage consists mainly of children between the ages of four and ten, for whom the visit is often their first theater experience, leaving lasting impressions.

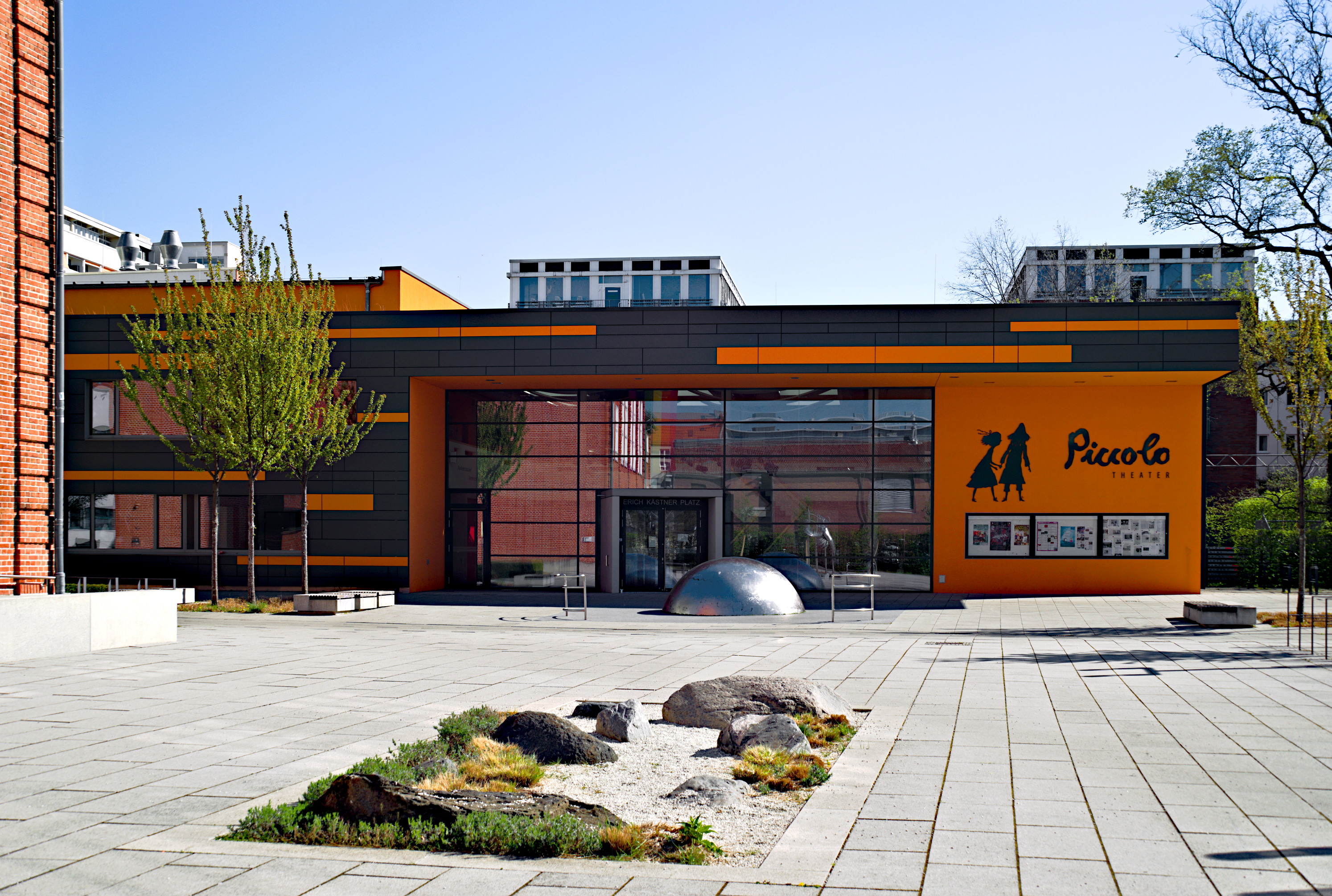
Piccolo Theater at Erich-Kästner-Platz

Musically, the city is home to the Philharmonic Orchestra Cottbus, the Singakademie Cottbus, the Cottbus Children's Musical, and, among ensembles, the children's and youth ensemble Pfiffikus, the student theater Bühne 8, as well as the Theater an der Wendeschleife in the Gladhouse.

=== Cinemas ===
With the Filmtheater Weltspiegel, Cottbus has the second-oldest purpose-built cinema in Germany after the Burg Theater in Burg (near Magdeburg). It was built in the Art Nouveau style. The "Obenkino" in the Gladhouse and the "KinOh Stadthalle" are other small cinemas in the city center. In addition, there is a UCI Kinowelt in the district of Groß Gaglow, near the Lausitz Park shopping center.

Every autumn since 1991, the Cottbus Film Festival has been held, focusing on Eastern European cinema. The festival center is located in Cottbus City Hall. Other venues include the State Theater, the Chamber Stage, the Filmtheater Weltspiegel, the Obenkino, and the Zelig.

=== Museums and galleries ===
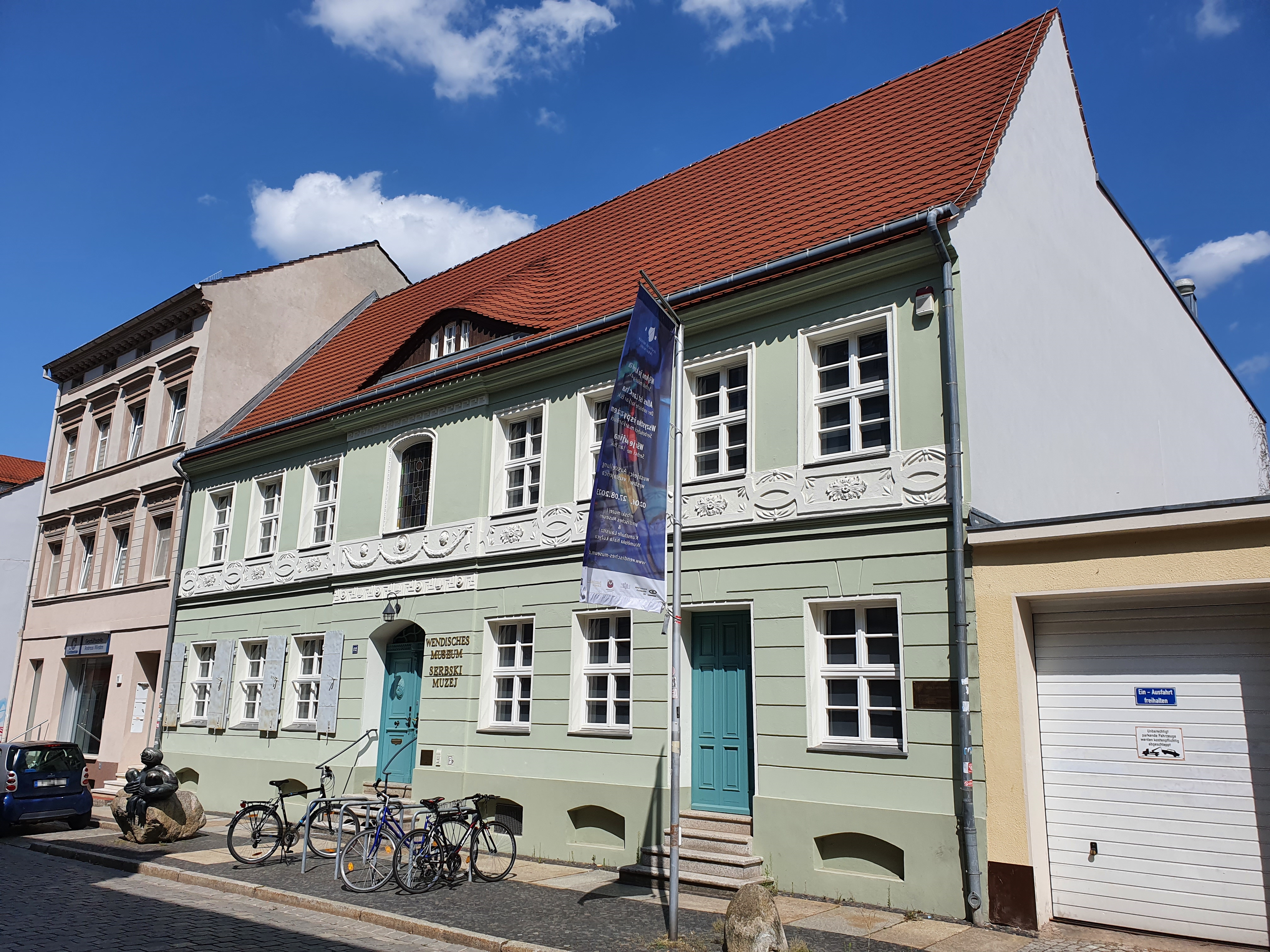
Wendish Museum

Pharmacy Museum

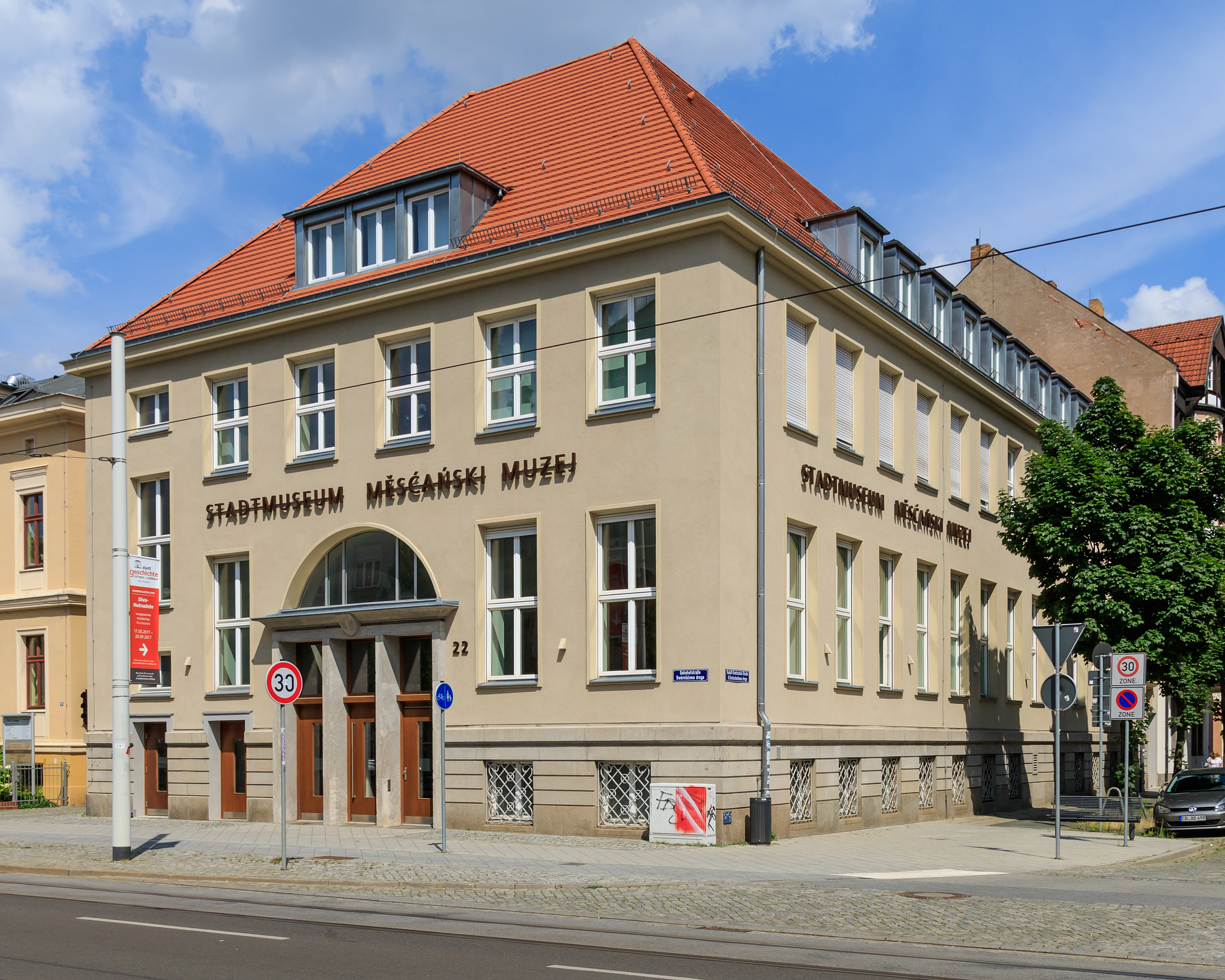
Municipal Museum

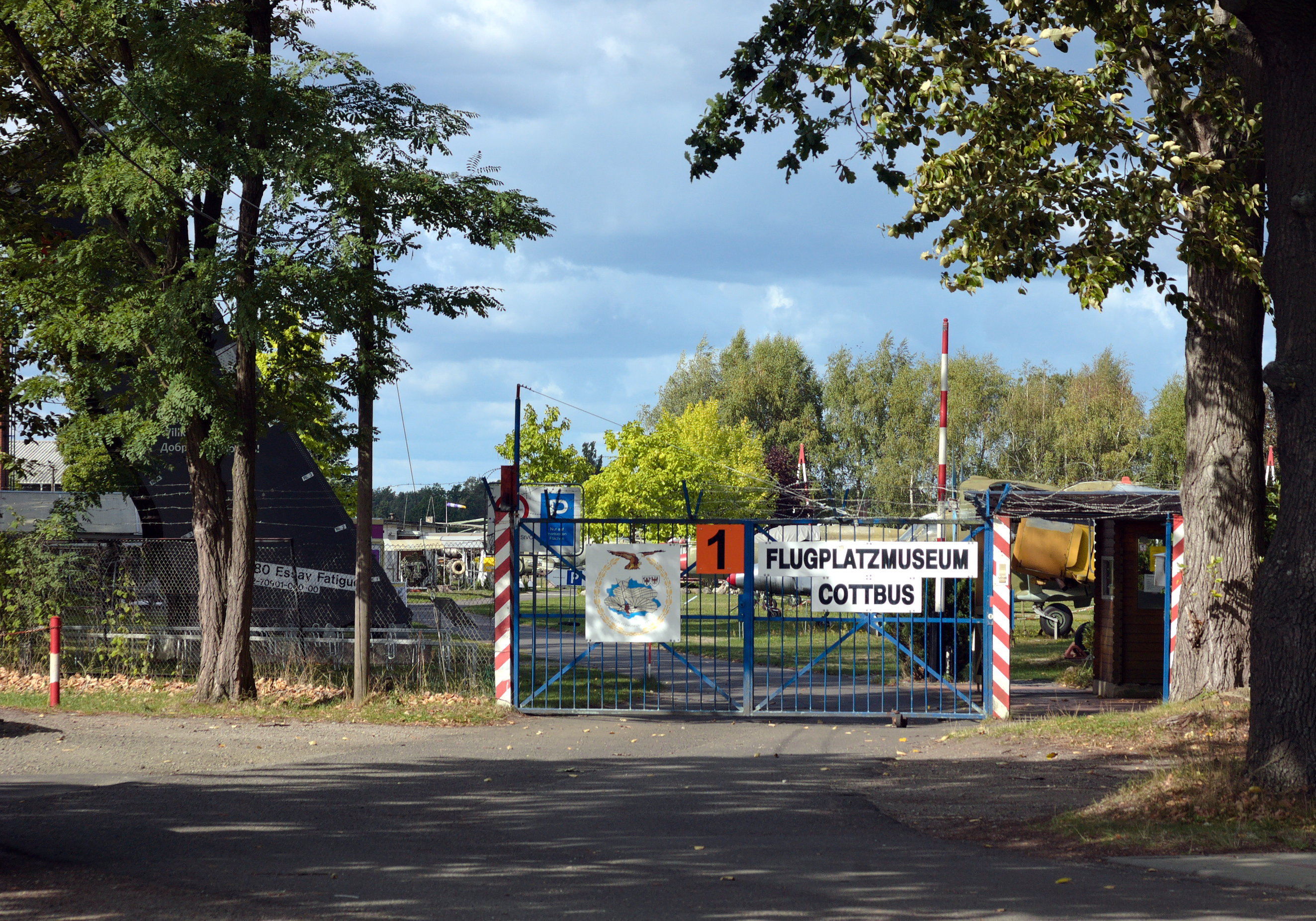
Airfield Museum

The Wendish Museum (Serbski muzej) offers insights into the culture and history of the Sorbs of Lower Lusatia. Numerous exhibits on traditional costumes, literature, art, music, customs, and ways of life document the unique culture of this Slavic population. The Cottbus City Museum and City Archive serve as the historical memory of the city, acting as contact points for history enthusiasts, local researchers, and historians. Both institutions are dedicated to the history of the city. Special exhibitions in the town hall and other municipal facilities also present interesting individual topics.

The Brandenburg Pharmacy Museum on Altmarkt is the only pharmacy museum in the state of Brandenburg. It displays complete pharmacy interiors from around 1830 and the first half of the 20th century. The Dieselkraftwerk Art Museum houses works of painting, sculpture, graphics, photography, and posters, focusing mainly on the thematic complex of landscape, space, nature, and the environment. The Galerie Haus 23, Galerie Fango, and Galerie auf Zeit offer sculptors, painters, photographers, and filmmakers from Cottbus and the region the opportunity to exhibit their works.

Opened in 1994 on the site of the former Cottbus-Nord airfield, the Airfield Museum showcases the history of Cottbus airfields and aviation in Lusatia. Other museums include the Water Museum in the Cottbus Waterworks and the technical monuments Spreewehrmühle and Parkschmiede Cottbus-Branitz. The Fürst-Pückler Museum Park and Branitz Palace Foundation introduces visitors to the history of the park and its creator, Prince Hermann von Pückler-Muskau, both in the palace itself and in a multimedia exhibition in the manor house.

=== Planetarium ===
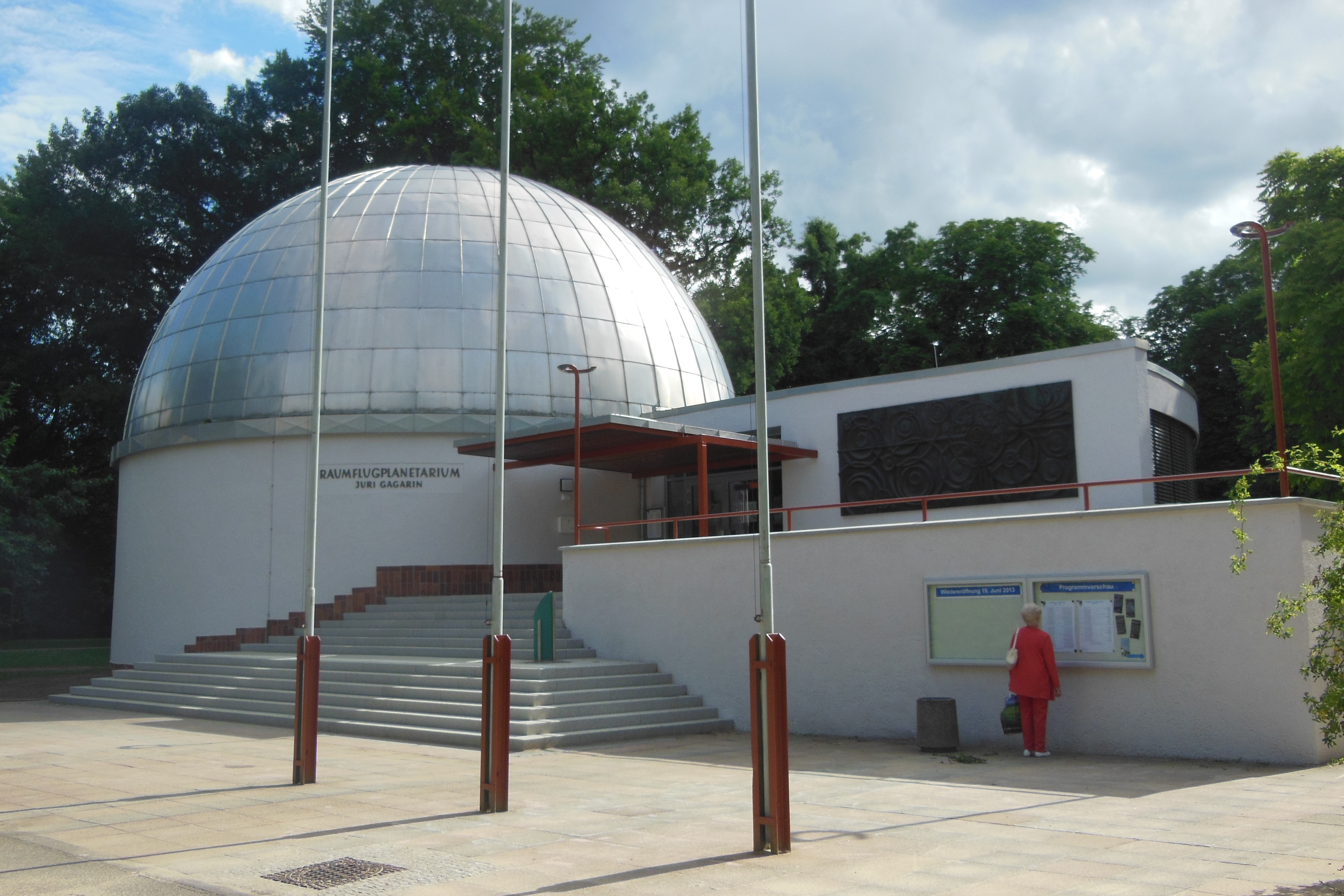
Planetarium

The Cottbus Raumflugplanetarium "Juri Gagarin", located in the Sachsendorf district, was opened on 26 April 1974 at what is now Lindenplatz. Until the end of 2012, it still operated with the original "Spacemaster – Raumflugplanetarium" star projector from Carl Zeiss Jena. Its dome, with a diameter of 12.5 meters, offers space for 91 visitors. Since 19 June 2013, the planetarium has been equipped with a modern hybrid projection system of the type Chronos II – InSpace, allowing for a combination of optical-mechanical and digital projections.

Today, the planetarium serves both as an educational institution and as a cultural venue, offering astronomy shows, lectures, and special programs for school groups. Equipped with advanced projection and sound technology, it presents not only astronomical topics but also music and multimedia events under its dome, making it a popular destination for both children and adults interested in science and space exploration.

=== Buildings ===
==== Individual buildings ====
The State Theatre on Schillerplatz was built in Art Nouveau style in 1907/1908 by Bernhard Sehring and inaugurated on 1 October 1908. During World War II, it was used as a munitions depot. In 1966, the theatre was placed under monument protection and underwent extensive restoration between 1981 and 1986.

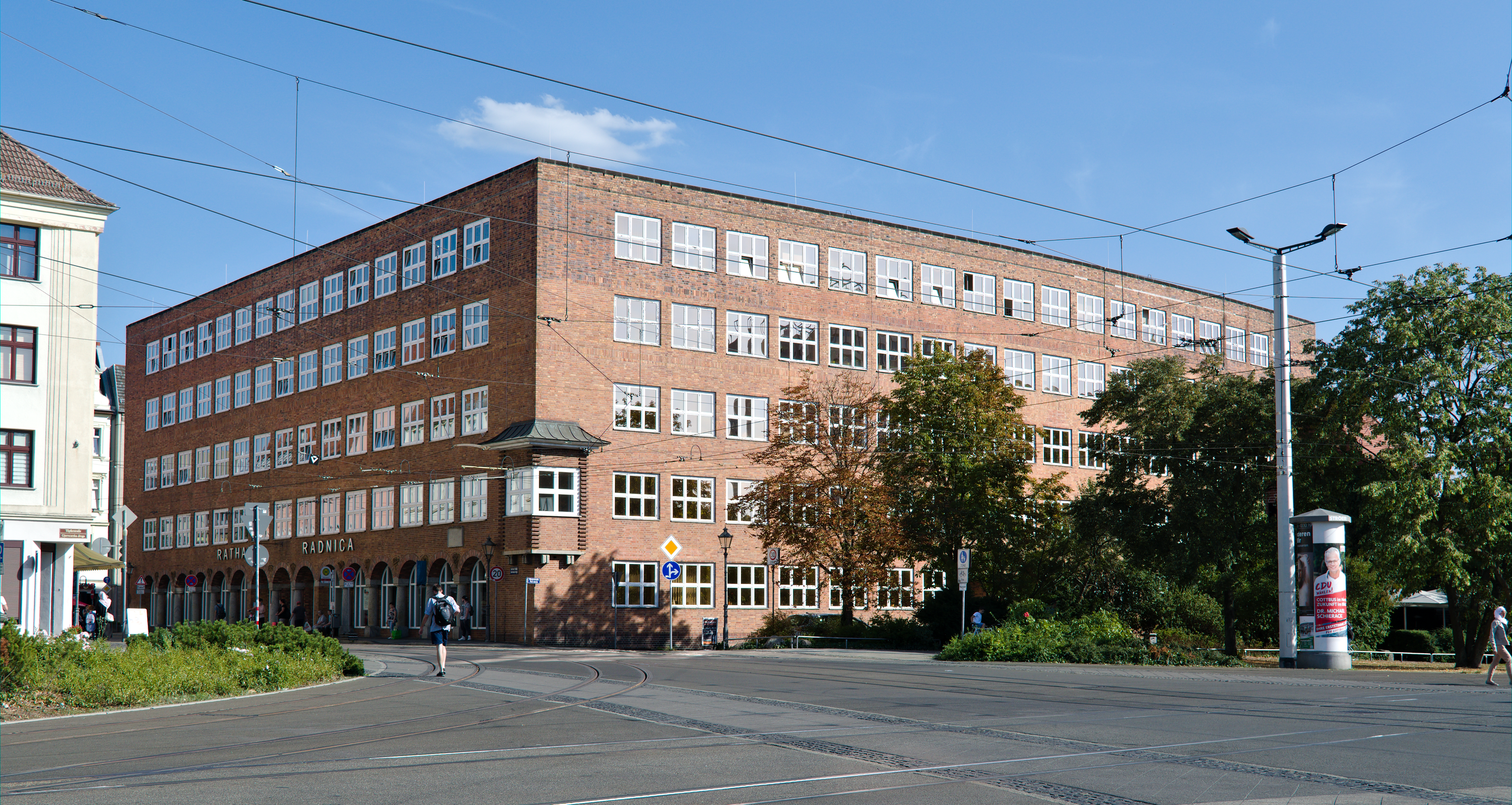
New Town Hall at Neumarkt

Between 1934 and 1936, the New Town Hall was built on Neumarkt. Previously, the site had included, among other things, the birthplace of Carl Blechen, commemorated by a plaque. The columned colonnades on Berliner Strasse feature reliefs of traditional Cottbus craftsmanship. During World War II, the building burned down after a bombing raid. In 1966 and 1967, the Town Hall was expanded by two additional floors due to space requirements. Diagonally opposite the Town Hall, the Cottbus Stadthalle was built on 3 October 1975.

In the 10th century, the Wends built a Slavic fortification on the sand island on the west bank of the Spree — the largest Slavic castle of Lower Lusatia and now known as Schlossberg. The Castle Tower is the oldest surviving building in Cottbus. On the site of the burned-down castle, the Regional Court was built between 1874 and 1878, during which the tower received a crenellated crown and a neo-Gothic spire. The Cottbus District Court building was erected between 1905 and 1907. On the opposite side of the street, along the Spree's mill canal, the Electricity Works was built from 1901 to 1903 in neo-Gothic style, powered by two water turbines, steam engines, and boilers to supply the city's tramway. The nearby Wilhelmsmühle was a fulling mill that ceased operation in 1941.

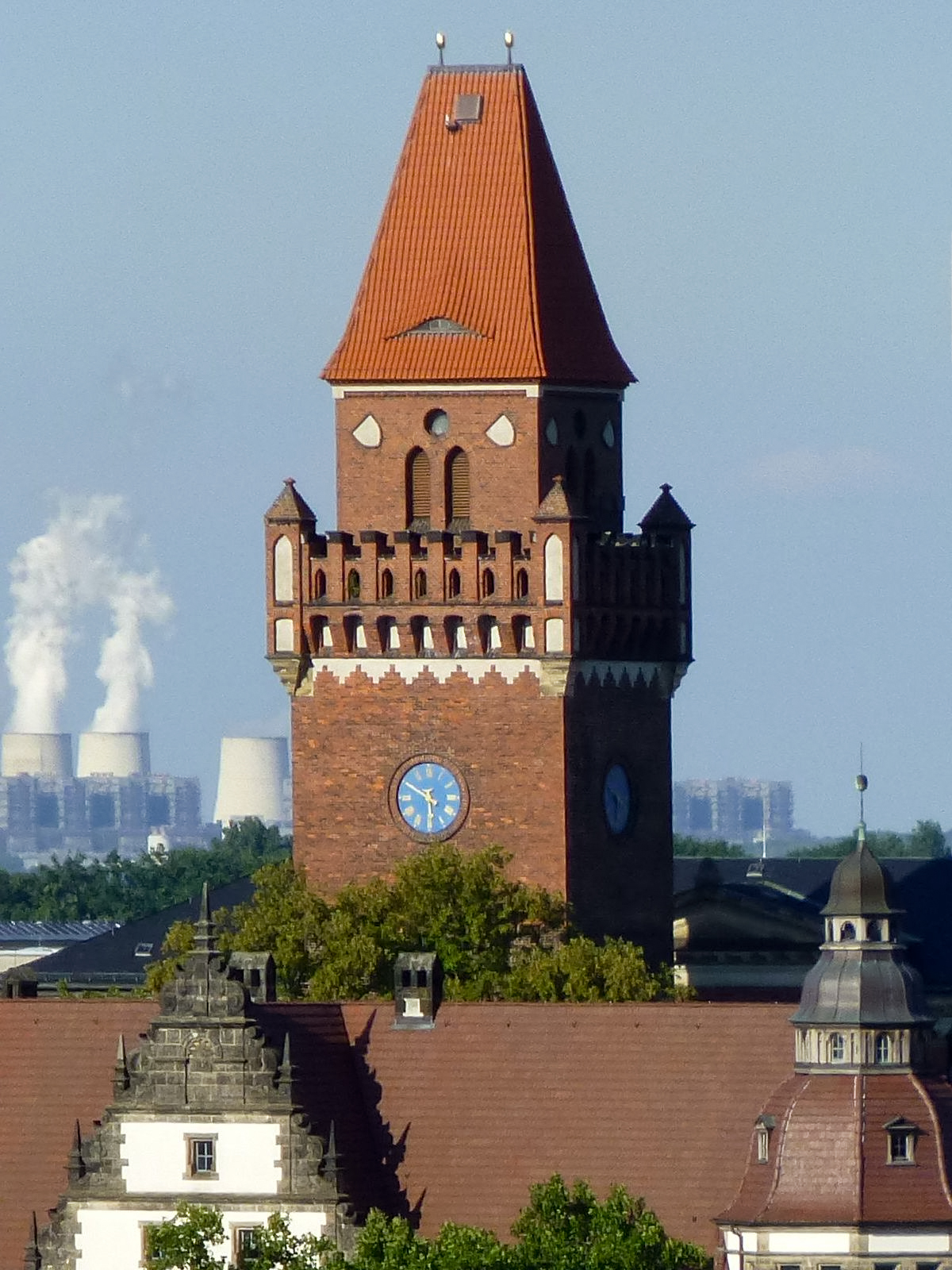
Castle Tower

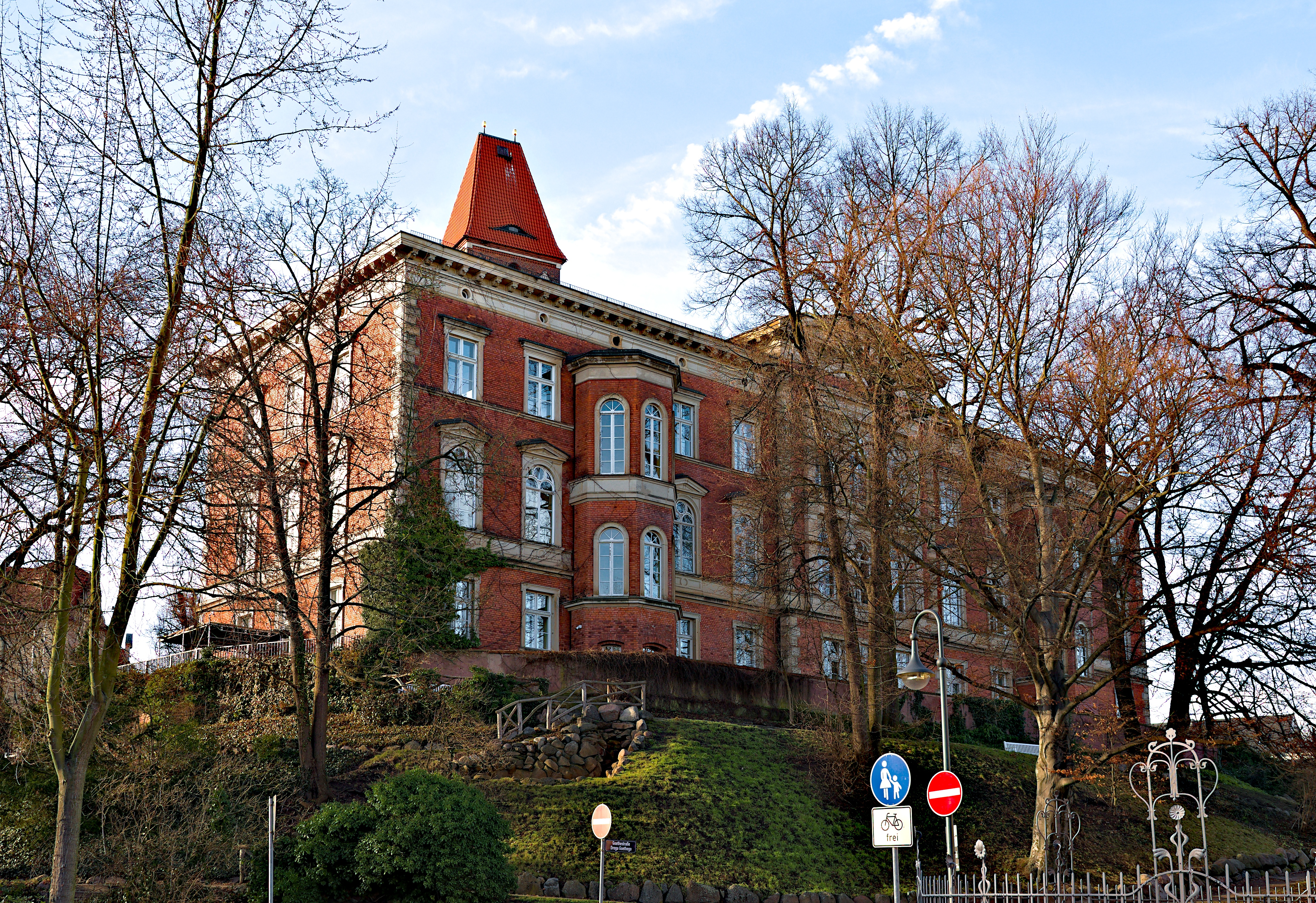
Regional Court

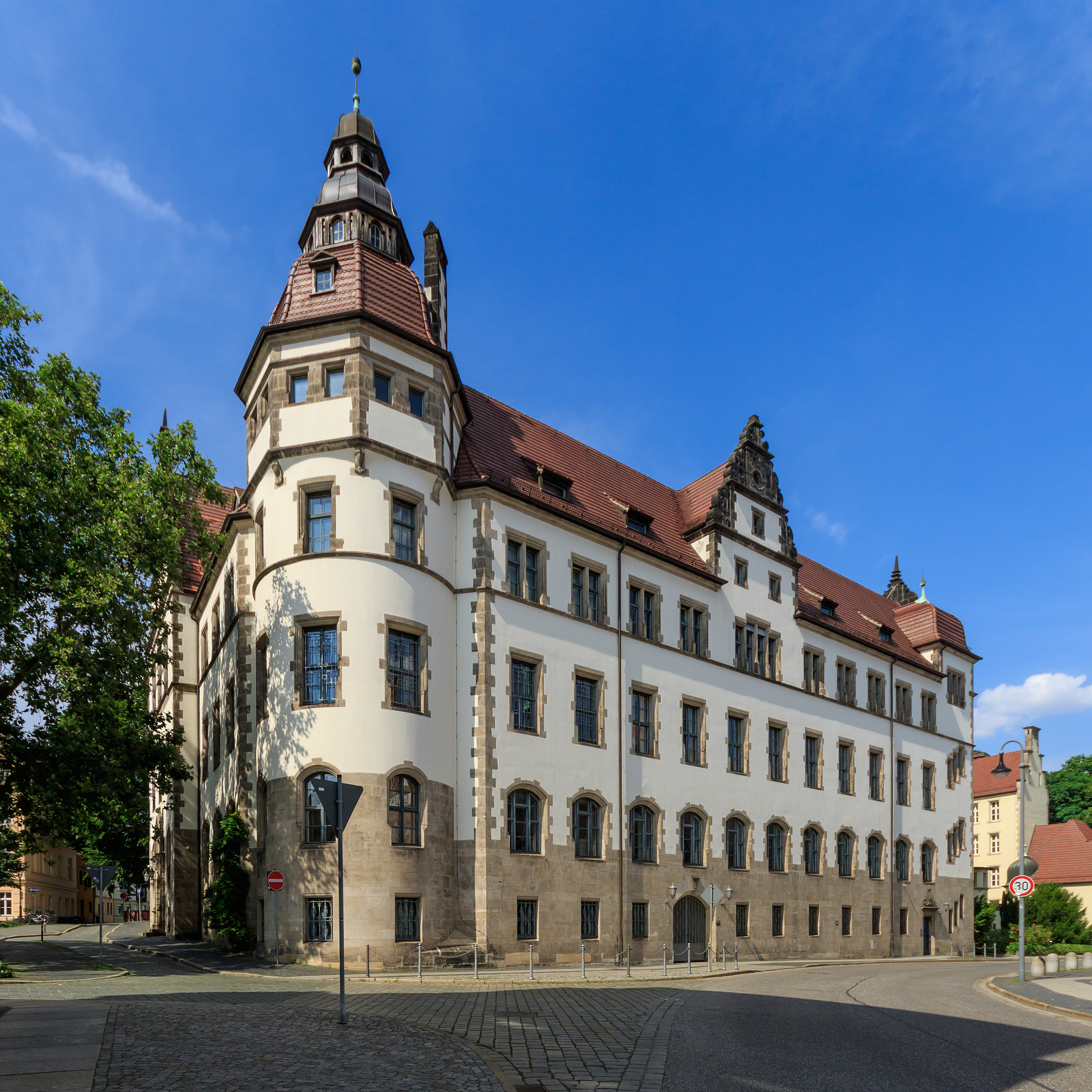
District Court

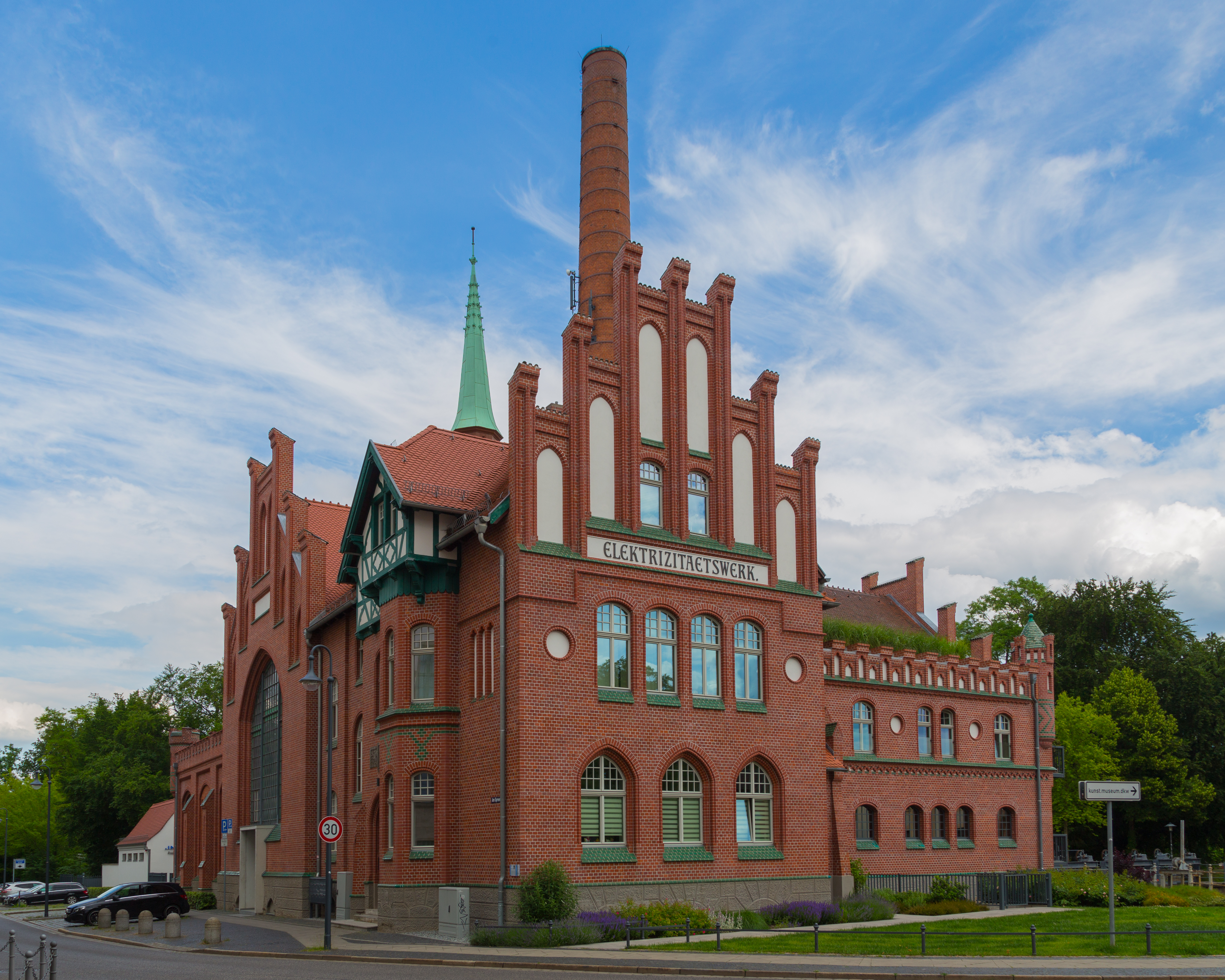
Old power station

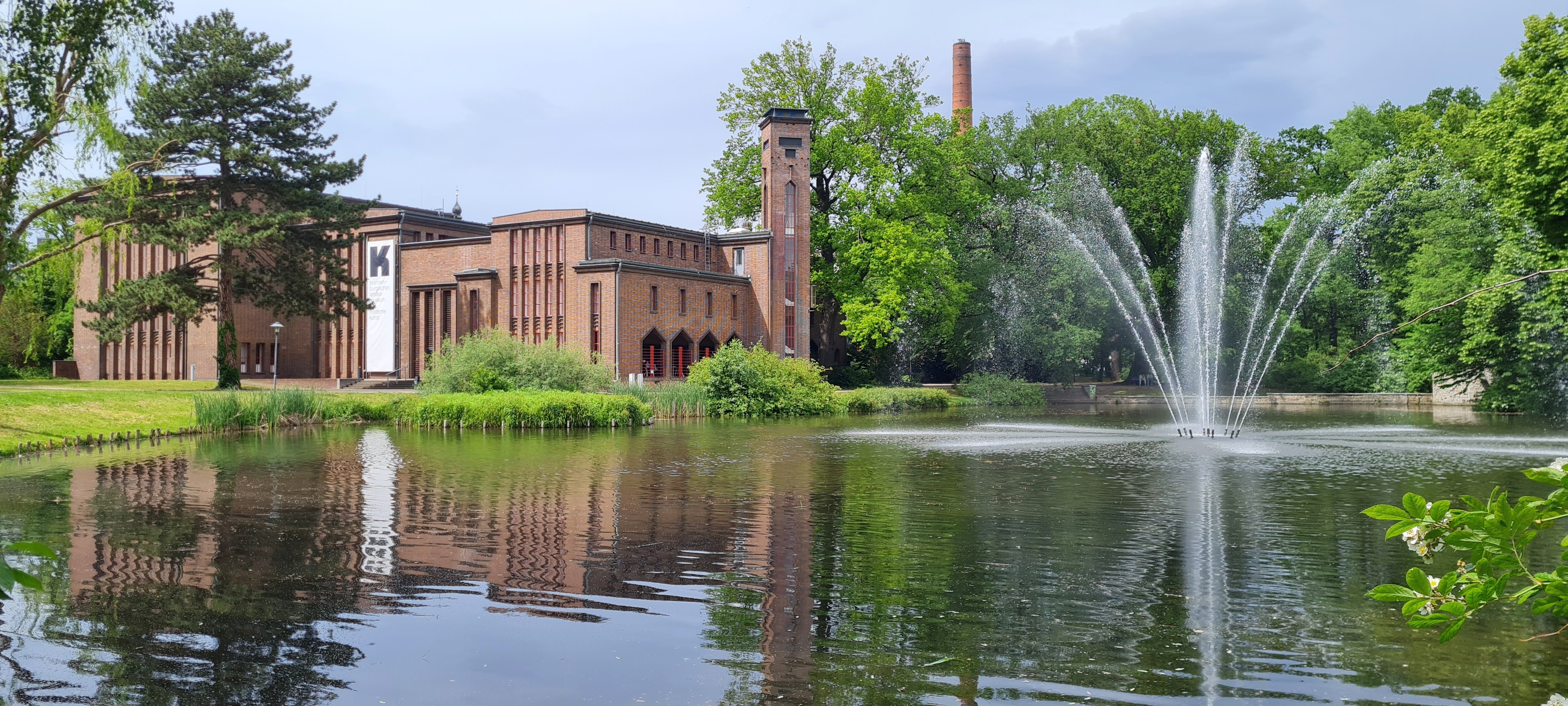
Kunstmuseum Dieselkraftwerk Cottbus

The Diesel Power Plant Cottbus was designed by architect Werner Issel and began operation on 1 April 1928. It comprised a machine house, a converter house and a switch house for a 1,500 hp diesel generator that was switched on during peak demand in the Cottbus power grid. The clinker bricks used in the façade came from the Ilse Bergbau AG works in Großräschen. The expressionistic triad of fire-red (window frames), dove-blue (steel doors) and turquoise (tile panels in Ullersdorf split quarters) is striking. The deliberate use of colours as structuring architectural elements is typical of the 1920s. Power plant operations ended in 1959. In 2008, after a long period of vacancy and extensive renovation by the city of Cottbus at the initiative of the Friends' Association, the building was reopened as the Brandenburg State Museum of Modern Art. The house-in-a-house construction for the exhibition rooms in the former machine hall made it possible to preserve the interior façade with the original clinker bricks. In the switch house there is a café and the administration offices. Here, too, furnishings recall the former use.

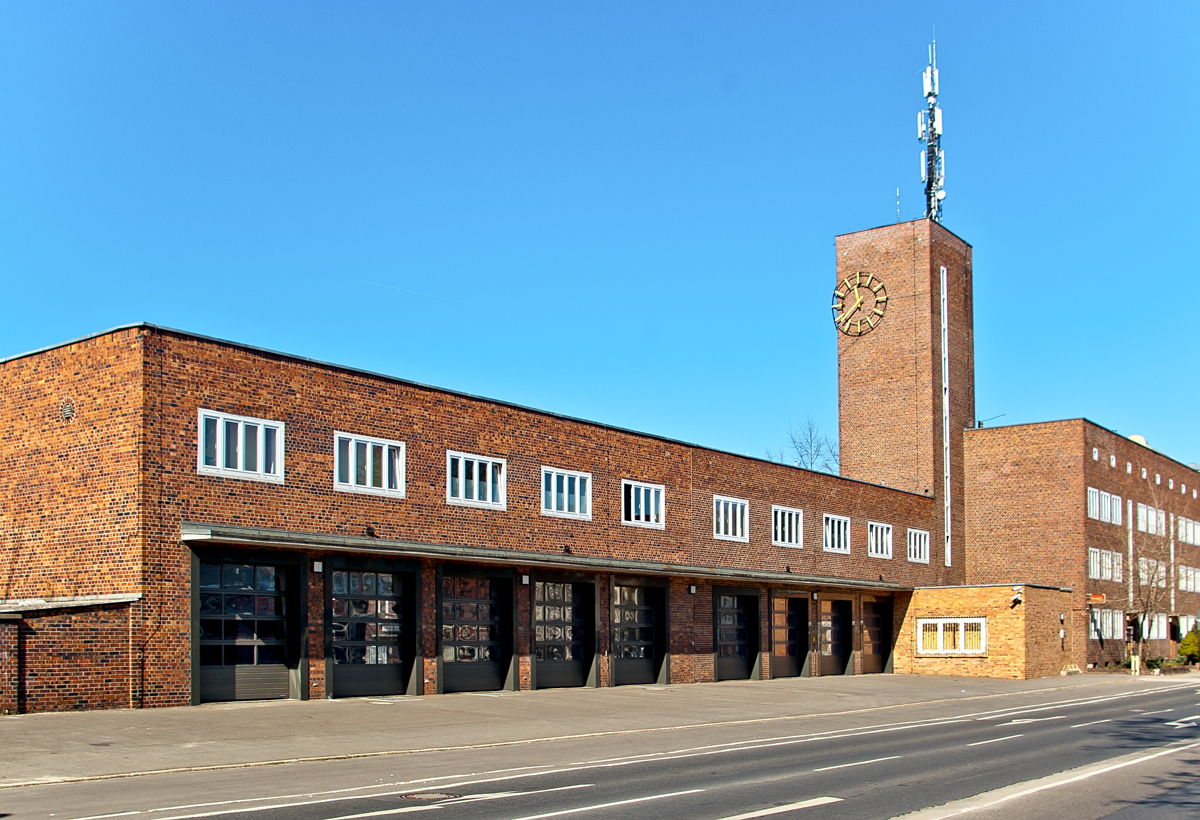
Sandow Fire Station

In the Weimar Republic, the housing shortage was addressed with state programmes. In addition to affordable housing, a more powerful fire brigade was needed. The construction of the new fire station met these requirements in the simple, functional style of modernism. Its inauguration in 1930 was celebrated during the 31st Brandenburg Association Day. The building complex is dominated by the striking tower with two clocks, which forms a counterpoint to the tower of the Upper Church at the other end of the street. In its structure, the main fire station follows the ideals of New Building: cubic forms determine the height and depth gradation, and the windows and doors are arranged in bands. The complex includes the adjoining residential building on the right with flats for the firefighters. As the requirements for the fire brigade increased after the Second World War, vehicle storage spaces and accommodation rooms were added to the left main building in 1967/68. After 1990, a flat in the neighbouring residential building was used to house a control centre. Since the new fire brigade control centre on Dresdener Straße was inaugurated in 1999, the historic fire station has been home to the professional fire brigade, the emergency services and, since 2000, the Sandow Volunteer Fire Brigade.

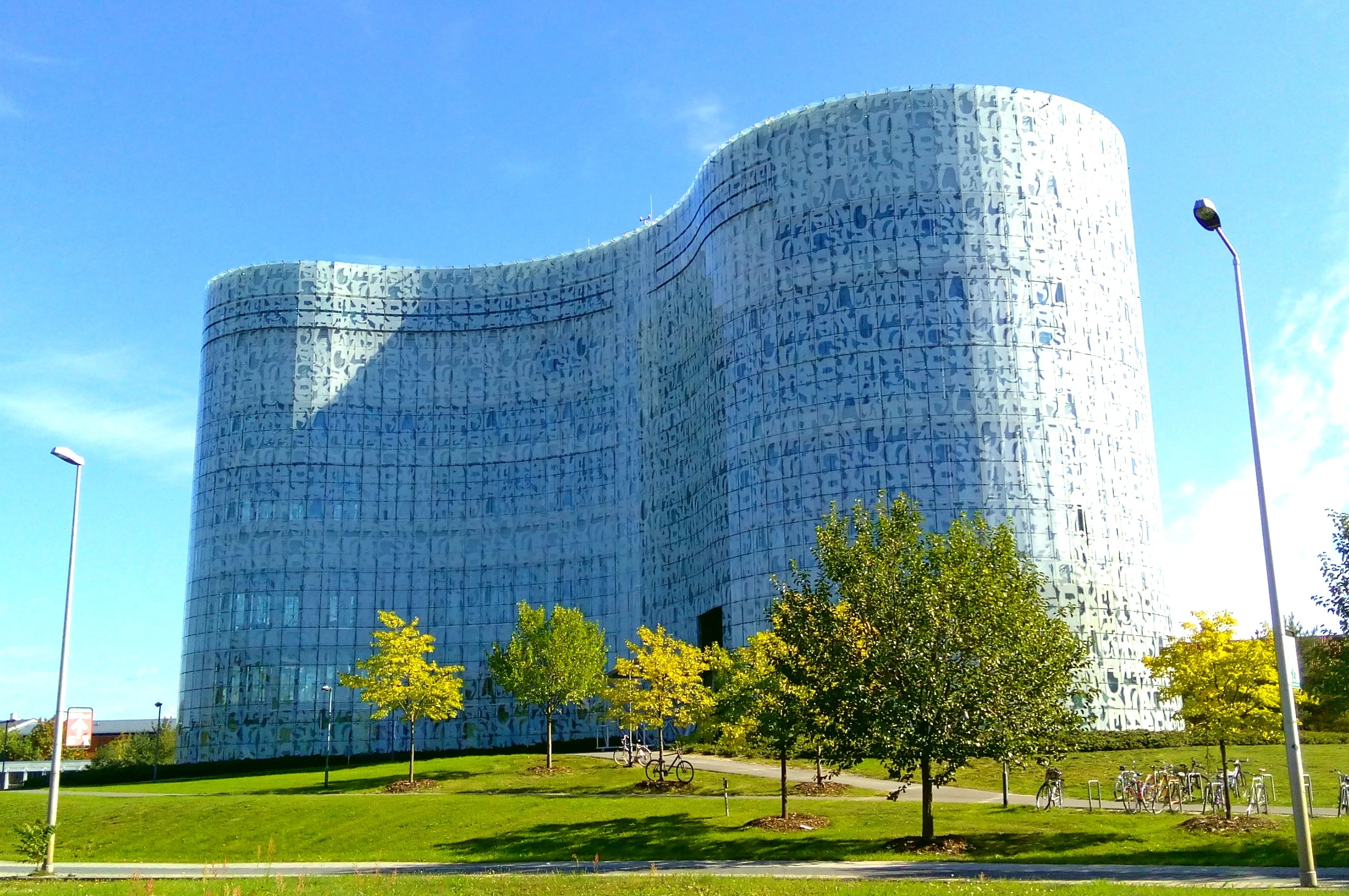
The library of the Brandenburg University of Technology

Since February 2005, the Information, Communication and Media Centre and the Panta Rhei Hall of the Brandenburg University of Technology campus have been among the nationally recognised sights of Cottbus. The building, designed by Herzog & de Meuron, was awarded the German Architecture Prize in 2007, among others.

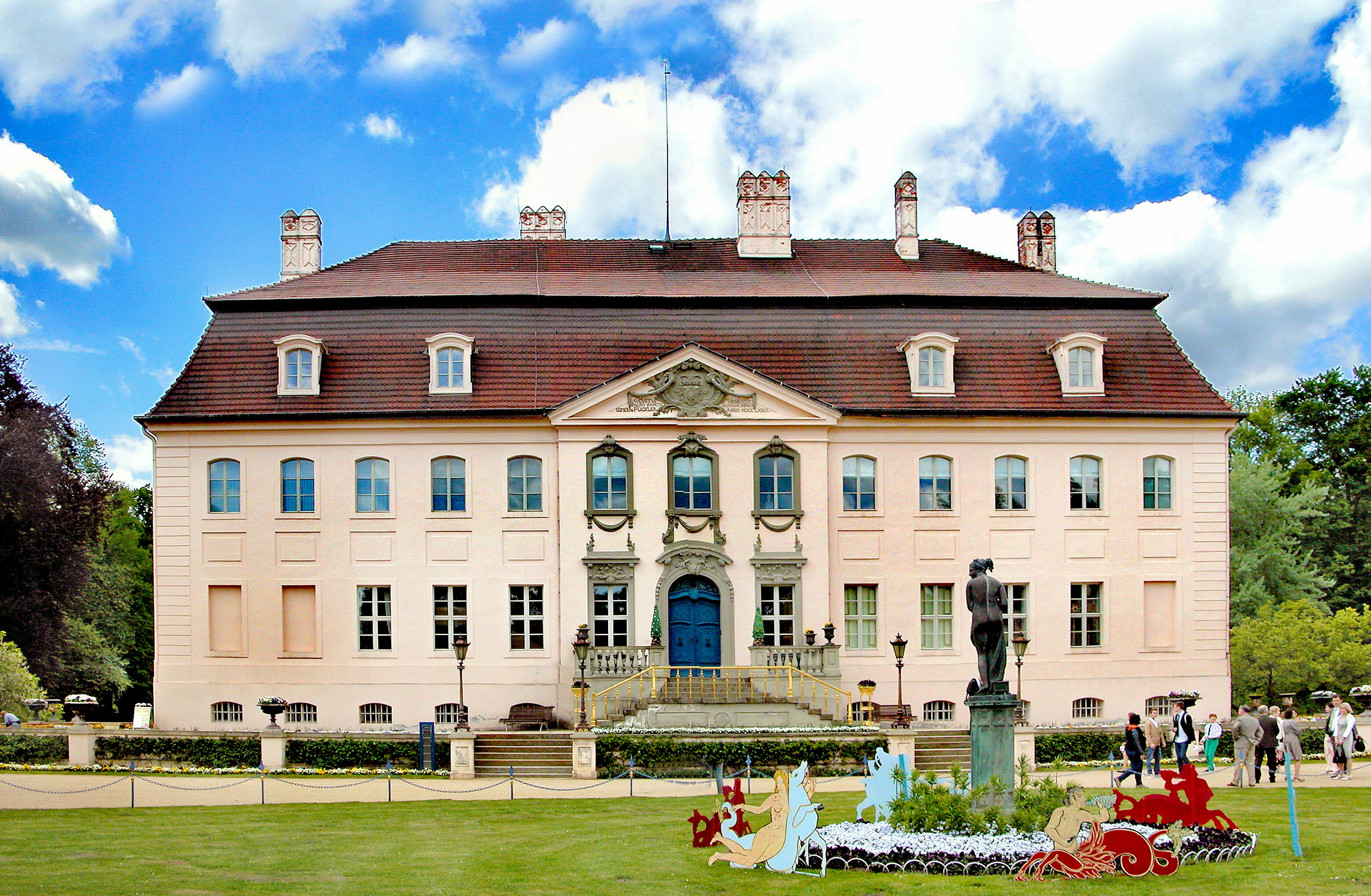
Branitz Castle

Branitz Castle in Branitz Park was built between 1770 and 1772 in the late Baroque style. After Prince Hermann von Pückler-Muskau moved the family's main residence to Branitz in 1845, the castle was remodelled and extended by the construction managers of the Berlin Building Academy. In addition, Pückler had a landscape park created. In 1934, the castle park was incorporated into the city of Cottbus from the municipality of Branitz. The buildings in the park include, in addition to the castle, the stables and the cavalier's house, the park smithy and the former inspector's residence, which today houses the visitor centre.

=== City fortifications ===
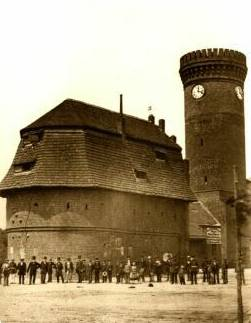
Spremberg Tower with bastion (circa 1875)

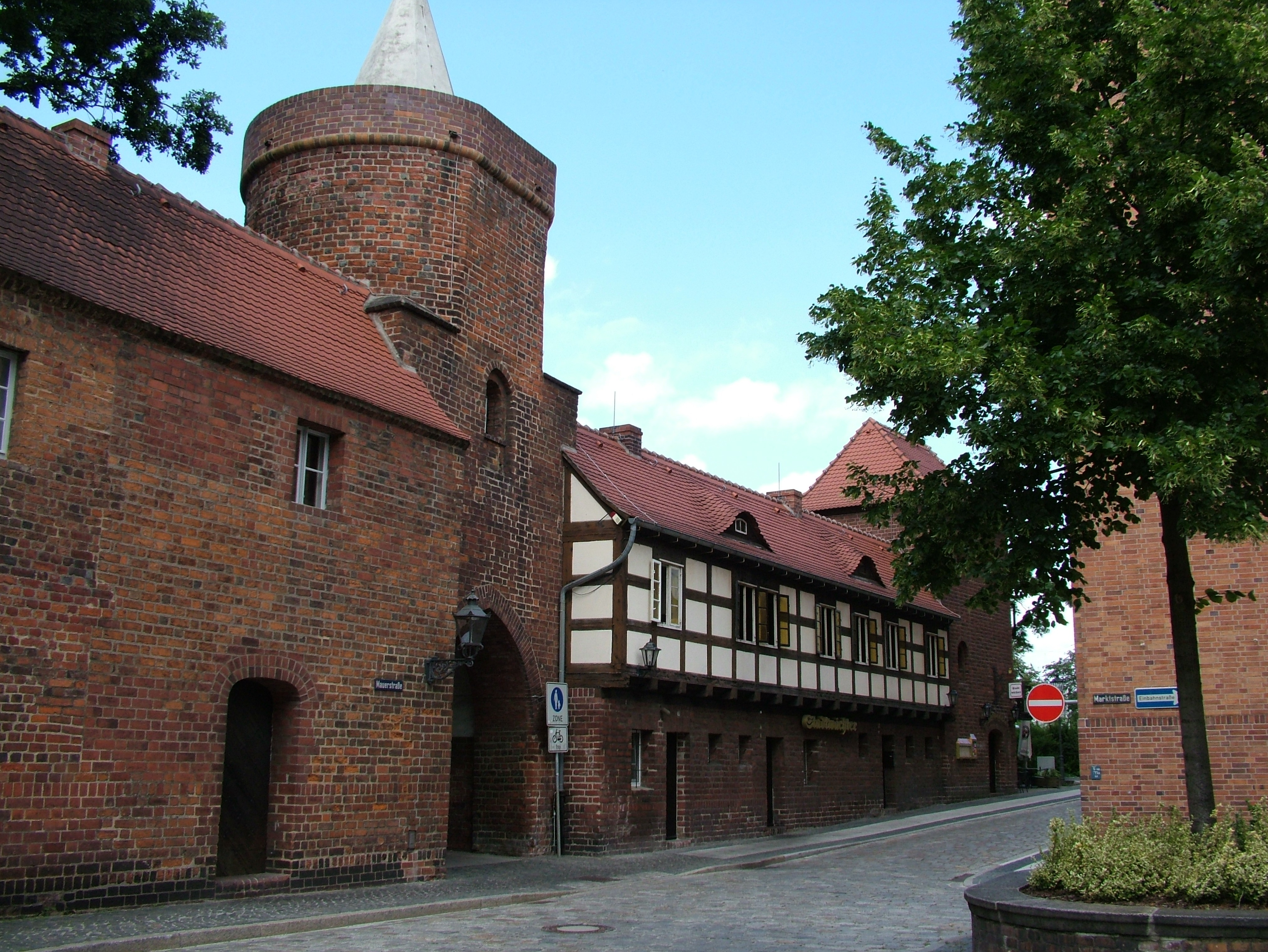
Linden Gate

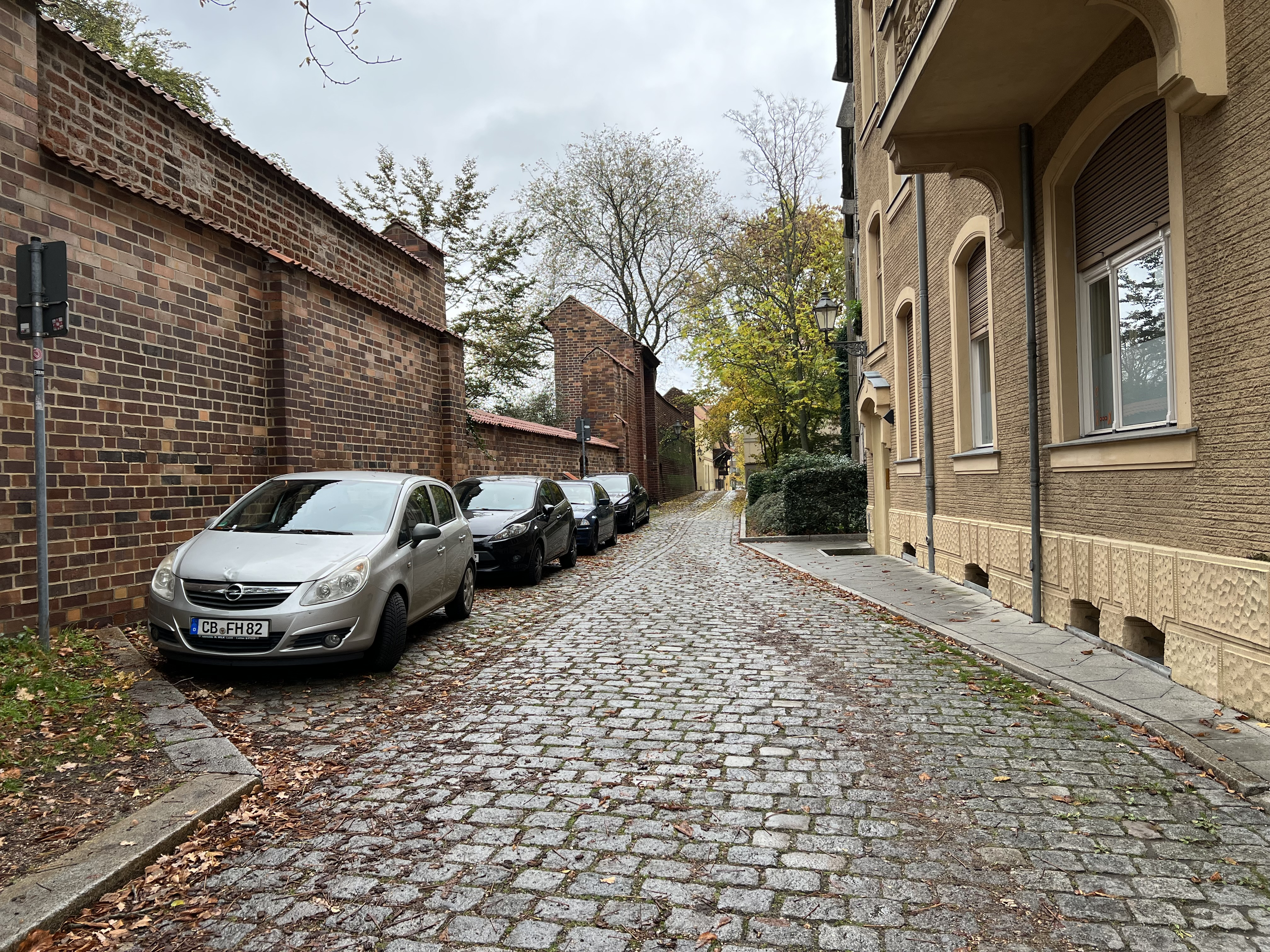
City wall in Töpferstraße

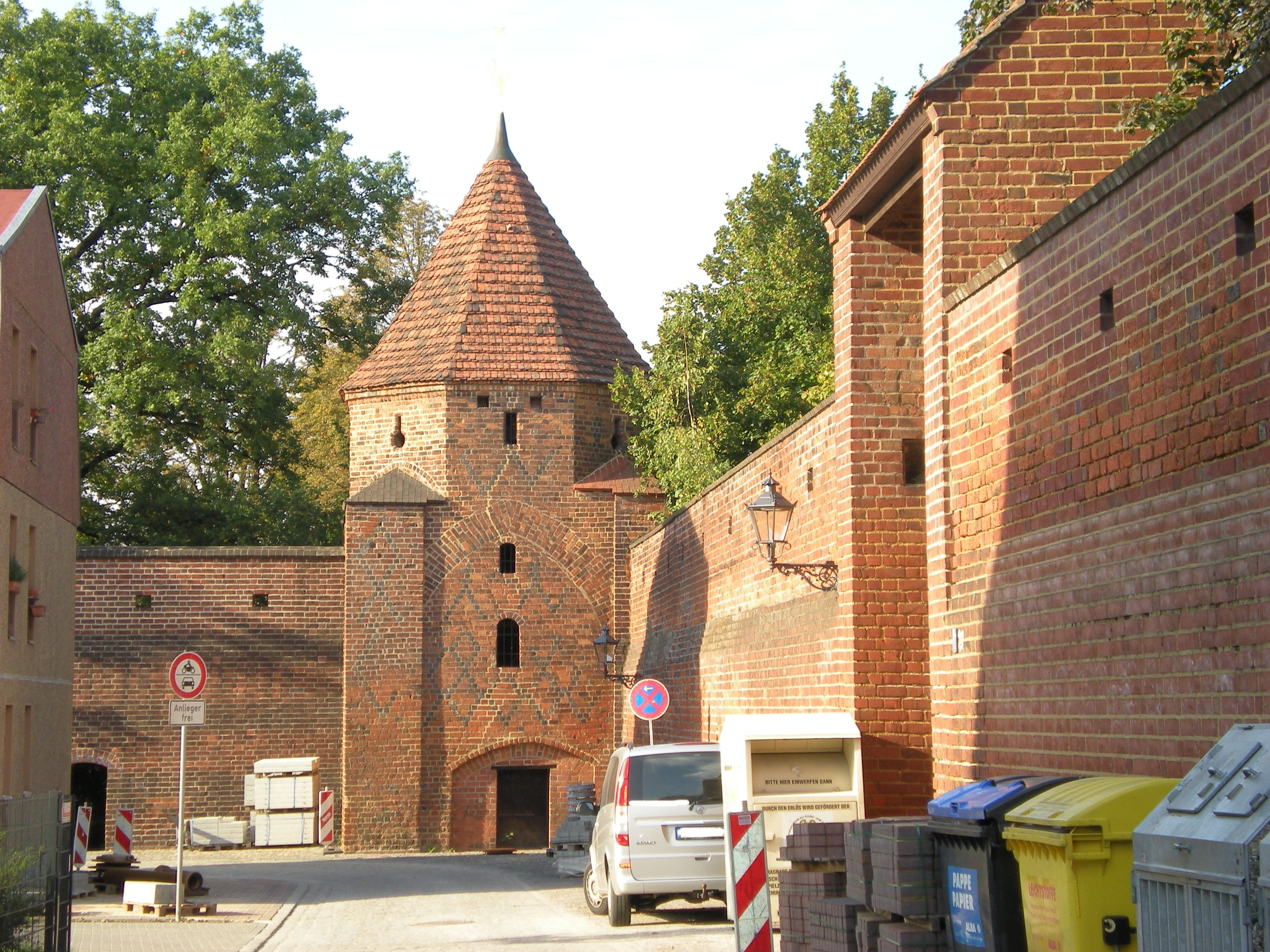
Mint Tower

The old town is surrounded by a defensive wall about 1,200 meters long. The 31-meter-high Spremberger Tower was built in the 13th century as part of the fortifications and, together with the bastion and gatehouse, formed the southern city gate. It received its crenellated crown between 1823 and 1825. The bastion was demolished in 1878.

The Mint Tower is the oldest tower in the city. The "Lords of Cottbus" are believed to have minted the Cottbus heller here as early as 1483, bearing the city's heraldic animal, the crayfish. Towers, gates, and wall houses along the medieval city wall reveal the layout of the old town. The Linden Gate was created to provide faster access from the old town to the market in the new town. For this purpose, in 1879, the wall tower in Mauerstraße was breached.

==== Building ensembles ====
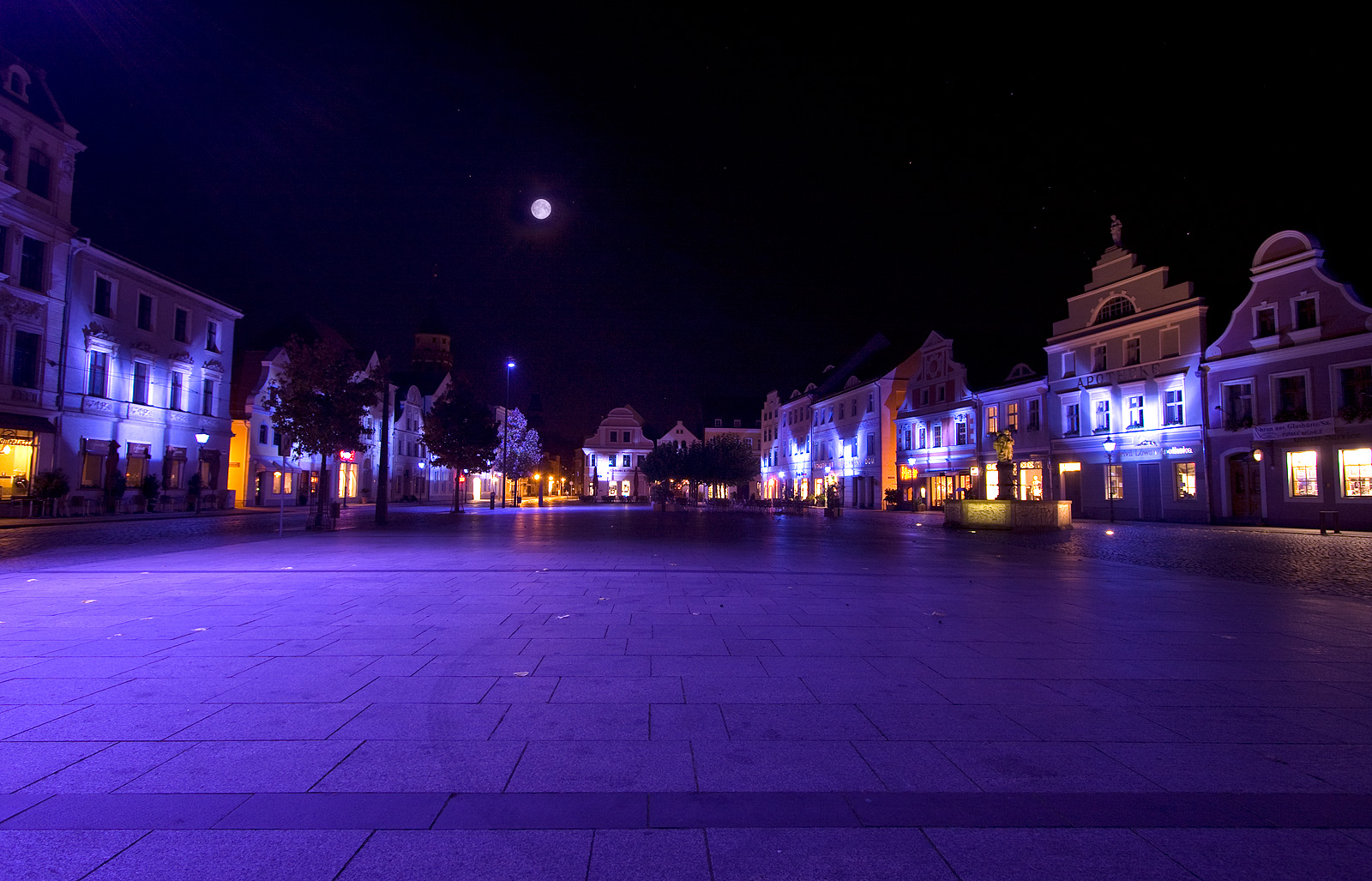
The Cottbus Altmarkt during the Festival of Eastern European Film

The Altmarkt (German for 'Old Market'; Lower Sorbian: Stare wiki) was probably laid out as early as the 13th century and was once an important trading place. The original timber-framed buildings were destroyed in the city fire of 1671; towards the end of the 18th and early 19th centuries, bourgeois houses in the Baroque style were built around the market. The old town hall on the market was destroyed in the Second World War and demolished without replacement in 1948. Southwest of the Altmarkt lies the newly designed, pedestrian-only Spremberger Straße (Lower Sorbian: Grodkojska droga), 300 meters long, characterized by residential and commercial buildings from the 19th century as well as from the 1950s. At Schlosskirchplatz, in the middle of Spremberger Straße, four architectural eras come together. The house at the eastern end of the square was the residence of the mayor, the pastor, and the French judge. In the south stands a work by architect Erich Mendelsohn in the style of New Objectivity.

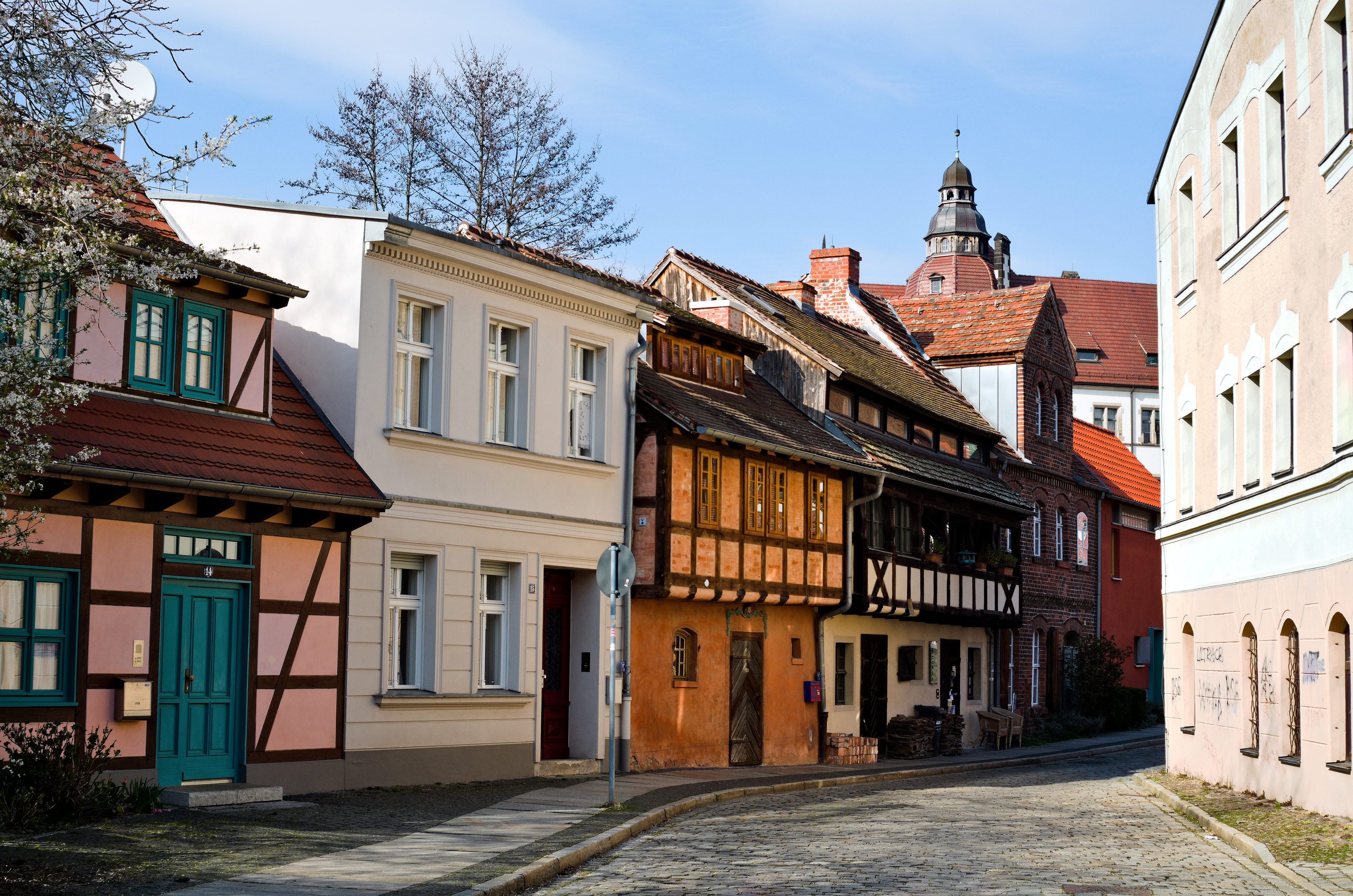
Tanners' houses at the Mühlengraben

At the Mühlengraben are the oldest preserved buildings in Cottbus, the bark-tanning and white-tanning houses. These illustrate the three developmental stages of the tanning trade. The small house from 1727 served as both workshop and dwelling. The middle house, built around 1760, was already a pure wall house. Around 1860, the brick building was erected. The Wendish Quarter was built between 1984 and 1989 on historic urban land between Berliner Platz and Oberkirchplatz, mostly in prefabricated concrete slab construction with old-town-style facades. Artistic works came from Sorbian and German artists.

==== Religious buildings ====
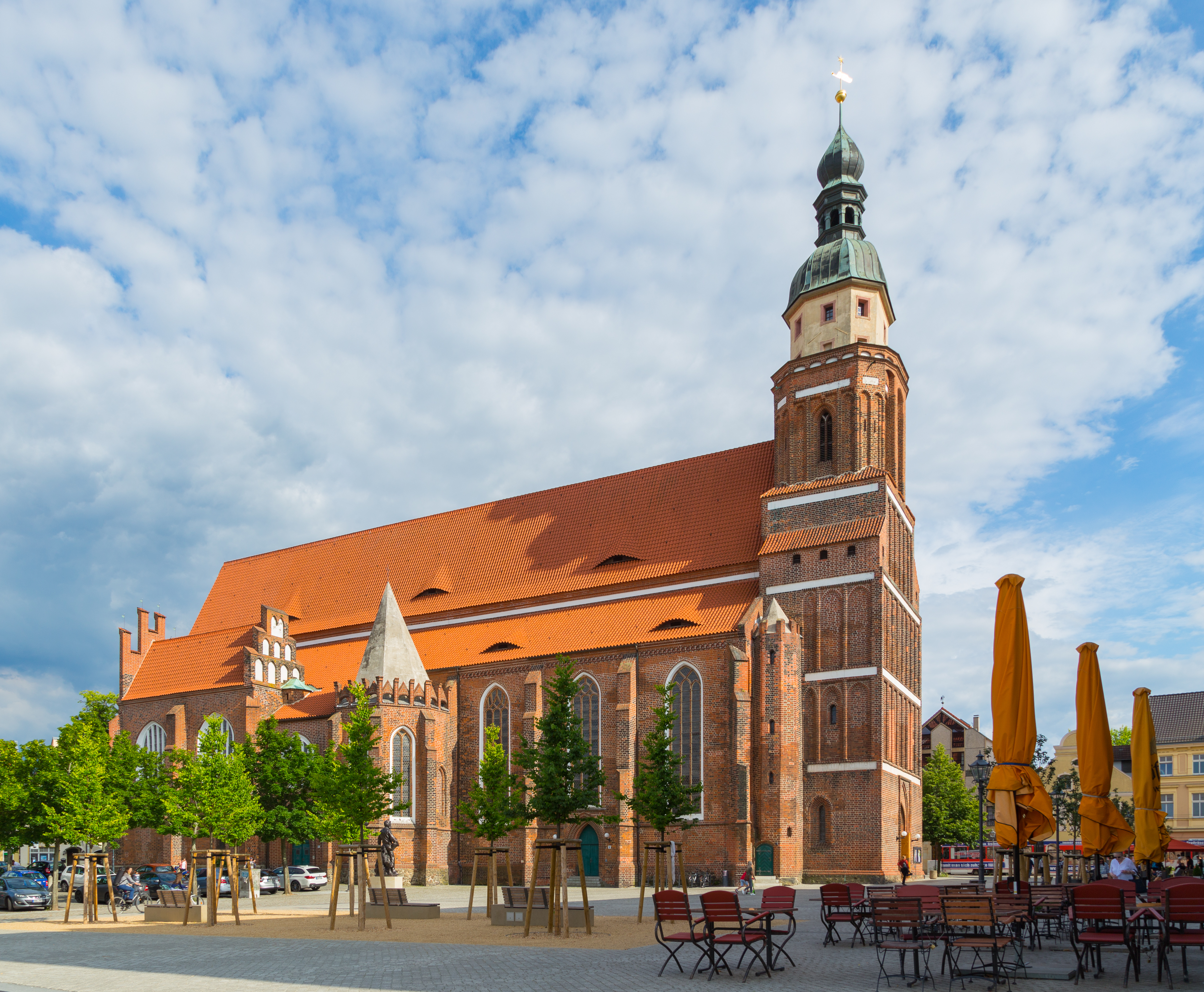
Upper Church of St. Nicholas

The main church in Cottbus is the Protestant Upper Church (Lower Sorbian: Wuša cerkwja) of St. Nicholas, a late Gothic three-aisled brick building from the 14th century. It is the largest church in Lower Lusatia and was formerly the place of worship for the Germans and the upper urban bourgeoisie. Inside, the star vaults and the high altar built in 1664 with magnificent alabaster carvings are worth seeing. The nave and chapel annexes contain several important tomb monuments from the 16th and 17th centuries. The 55-meter-high church tower offers a good view over Cottbus.

The Protestant Monastery Church is also called the "Wendish Church" (Lower Sorbian: Serbska cerkwja) because it was formerly responsible for the Wendish rural population and the serving class. It is the remaining part of the former Franciscan monastery from the 13th and 14th centuries. The oldest church in Cottbus contains, with the tomb slab of the city's founder showing the still-valid heraldic animal, an important testimony to the city's history.

The former Protestant Castle Church was built in 1419 as St. Catherine's Church and was later destroyed several times by fire. On its foundations, after the arrival of the Huguenots in 1714, the present church was erected as a single-nave plastered building with a hipped roof and sacristy. In 1870, it received the neo-Gothic tower. On September 18, 2014, the church was handed over to the Jewish community for conversion into a synagogue.

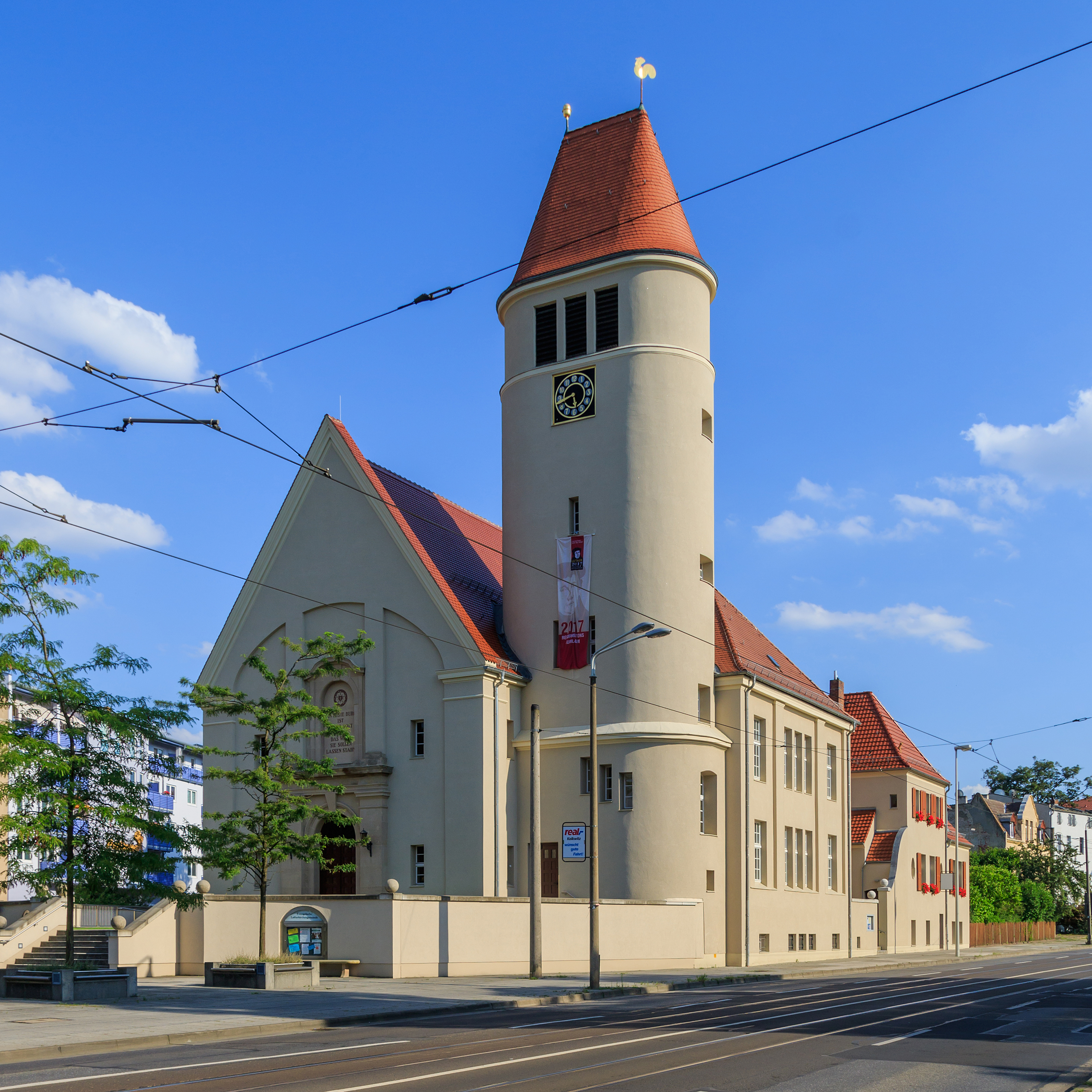
Lutherkirche

The Lutherkirche ('Luther Church') in the Spremberger suburb was built between 1911 and 1912 under the direction of Robert Leibnitz in simple Art Nouveau forms as a free-standing hall church with a side tower. The Kreuzkirche of the Independent Evangelical-Lutheran Church was built in 1878/79 as a towerless neo-Gothic brick building for the Evangelical-Lutheran (Old Lutheran) Church. Another Protestant church is St. Martin's Church in the district of Madlow.

The first Catholic church after the Reformation was the Christuskirche (Christ Church), erected in 1850 as a neo-Gothic brick building. Between 1934 and 1935, near the old town, the provost and parish church of St. Mary Queen of Peace was built as a twin-towered clinker brick building. In the district of Sachsendorf, the Catholic Edith-Stein Church was built in 1989.

=== Memorials ===
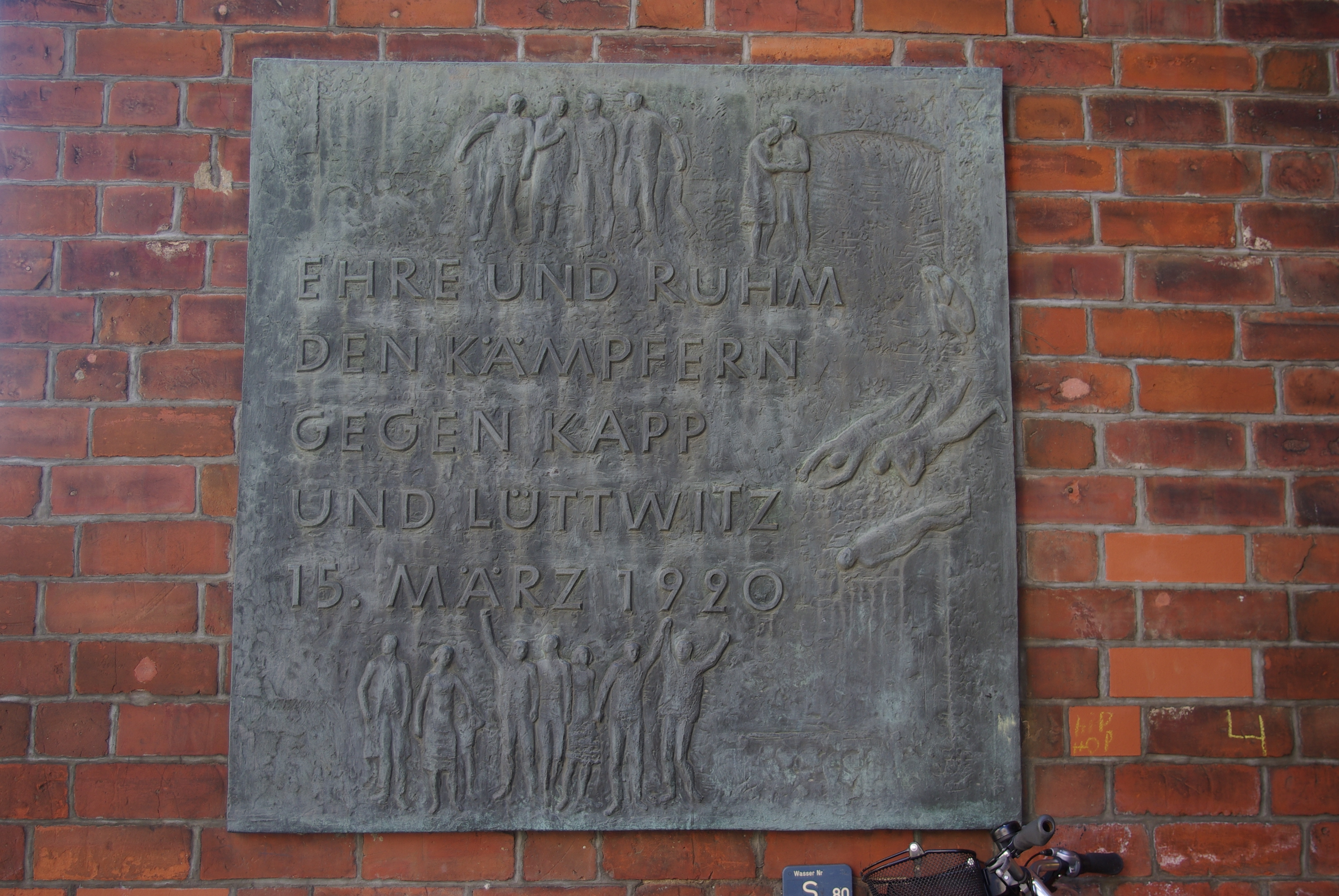
Memorial plaque commemorating the resistance against the Kapp Putsch at the Spremberg Tower

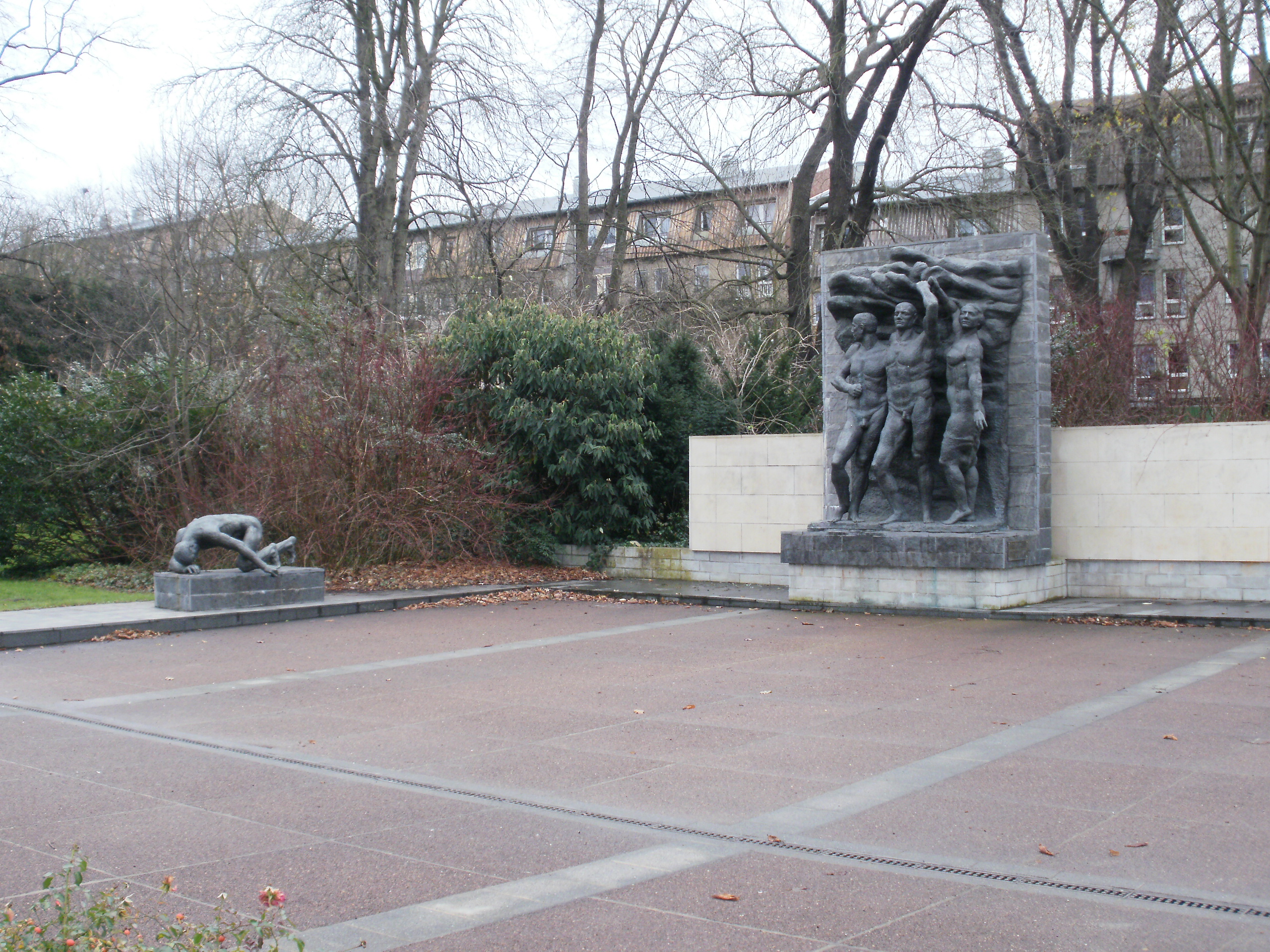
Memorial to the victims of the anti-fascist resistance struggle on Pushkin Promenade

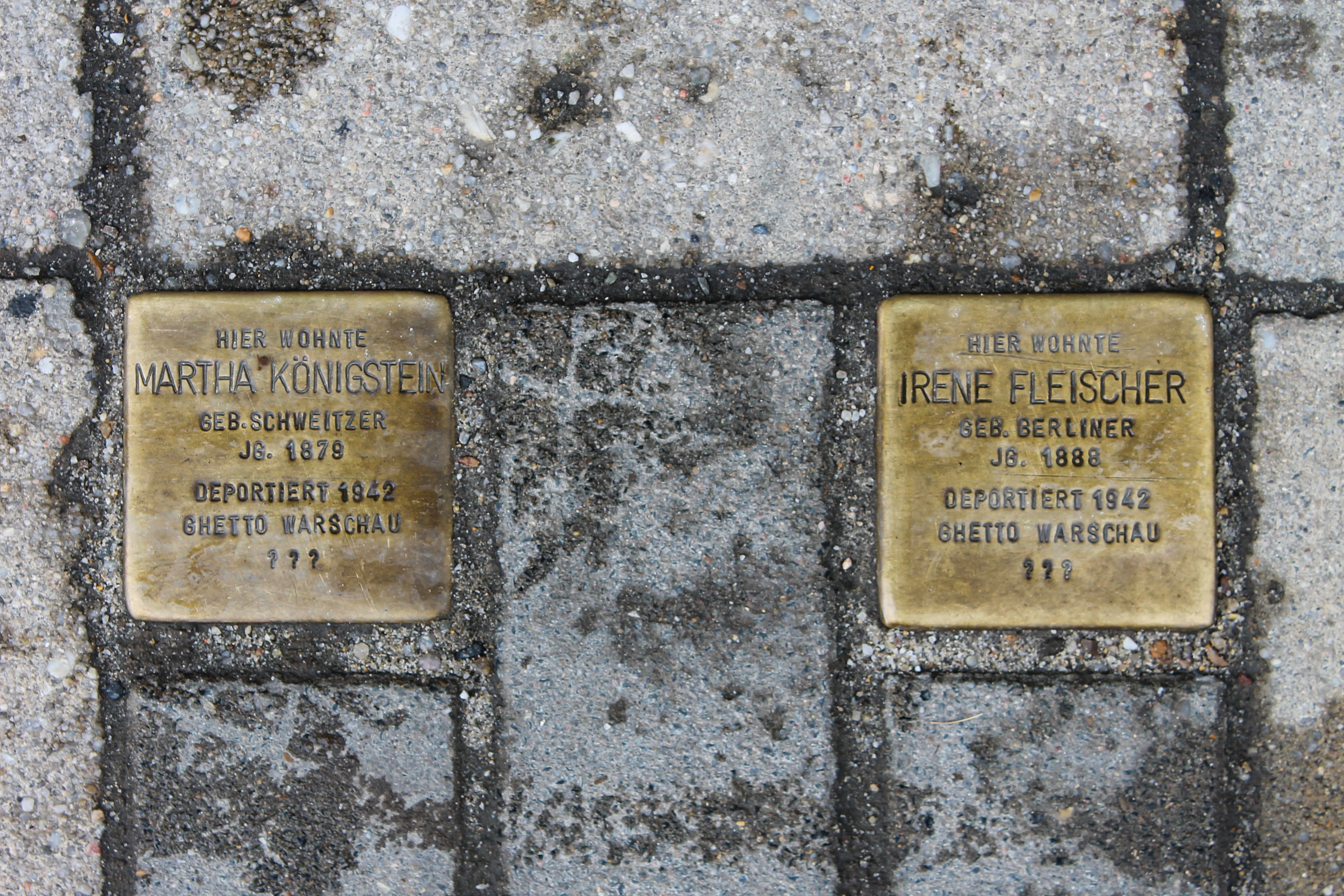
Stolpersteine at Lessingstraße 4
- Commemorative plaque to the resistance against the Kapp Putsch at the Spremberger Tower.
- Commemorative plaque at the site of the old Jewish cemetery in Straße der Jugend No. 54, destroyed by the National Socialists, bearing the symbol of the Star of David.
- Memorial stone for persecuted and murdered Jewish citizens of Cottbus at the mourning hall of the new Jewish cemetery in Dresdener Straße, extension of Straße der Jugend.
- A total of 77 "stumbling stones" embedded in pavements for former Jewish fellow citizens.
- Memorial and grove of honor for the victims of National Socialism in the southern cemetery.
- Monument with sculpture at the Soviet grove of honor in the southern cemetery for 400 fallen soldiers of the spring offensive of 1945.
- Soviet grove of honor in the Ströbitz cemetery for dead prisoners of war and forced laborers.
- Memorial to the victims of the anti-fascist resistance struggle at Pushkin Promenade (Lower Sorbian: Puškinowa promenada).
- Cottbus Prison Memorial on the site of the former penitentiary.

==== Architectural trail ====
Architecturally or historically valuable buildings in the city are marked with the Cottbus Architectural Trail. Signage on buildings points this out and shows the history of the buildings. The trail is divided according to periods of origin, and at each location there are signposts showing which buildings can be found nearby.

==== Natural monuments ====
Saretz Oak in the district of Saspow with a circumference at breast height of 7.50 meters (2016)

=== Parks and green spaces ===
==== Branitz Park ====
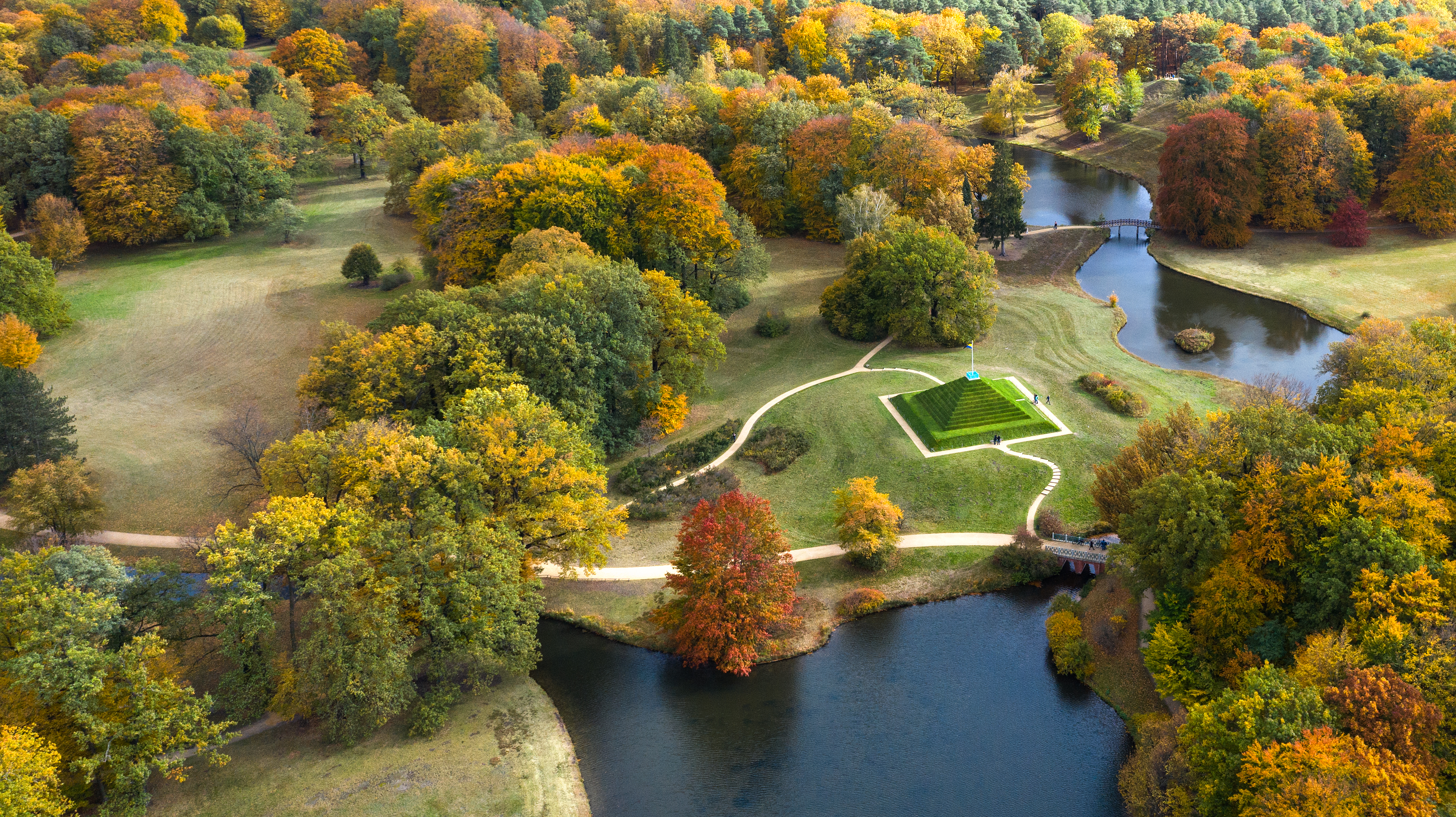
View over the park to the north

Branitz Park is the most important and well-known park in Cottbus. Branitz came into the possession of the Counts of Pückler in 1696. In 1845, Hermann von Pückler-Muskau began the construction of the new park. The landscape park he created, which was completed by his successor, is a work of garden art of international significance. The renowned writer and world traveler Prince Pückler was, alongside Peter Joseph Lenné and Friedrich Ludwig Sckell, one of the most famous German landscape designers of the 19th century. Branitz Park was laid out as a zoned landscape park with stylistically differentiated areas.

At the center of the complex is the castle, built between 1770 and 1772. The castle is surrounded by the pleasure ground, richly decorated with flower beds, sculptures, other decorative elements, and ornamental shrubs. Here Pückler also used exotic trees, while in the other areas of the park he planted only native species.

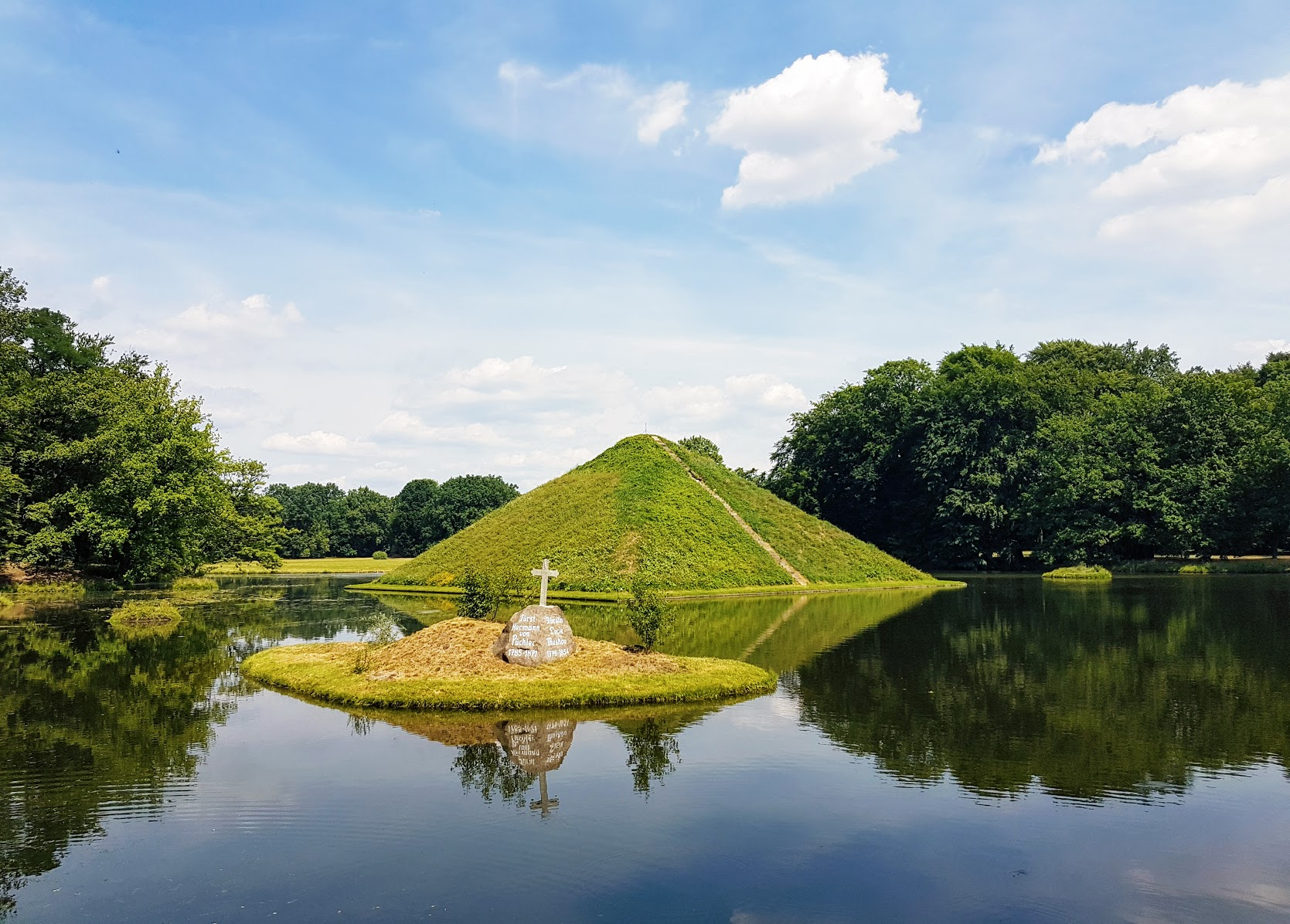
Water pyramid and burial site of Pückler in Branitz Park

The adjoining "inner park", with an area of about 100 hectares, includes the estate's farm buildings, the nursery, the park forge, the Cottbus and Branitz gatehouses, as well as the pyramid area. Prince Pückler also designed the surrounding farmland, the "outer park", as an ornamental farm on a total area of about 600 hectares. For the design of the park, Prince Pückler used the high groundwater level and the nearby Spree River to create an artificial water system in his park. Using the excavated material from the lakes and canals, he had the perfectly shaped terrain relief of the park created. The reed lake section is particularly beautifully designed.

The pyramid area impresses with its two unique earth pyramids: the land pyramid, formerly built in stepped form (constructed 1860–1863), and the lake pyramid, the tumulus (constructed 1856). Prince Pückler was buried in the tumulus in 1871. In 1884, his wife and life companion, Lucie von Pückler-Muskau, who had died in 1854, was also reburied there.

Through grouping of trees, shaping of the relief, and routing of paths, the prince created with Branitz Park a kind of picture gallery in which the walker encounters a sequence of three-dimensional landscape images.

==== Goethe Park and Carl Blechen Park ====
In 1898, on the damp lowlands of Mühleninsel, the first Cottbus park, Goethe Park, was created through the initiative of Mayor Paul Werner and the Beautification Society. The pond within the park was created as early as 1600 for fish farming. From 1914 to 1935, further development of the once swampy area took place. The design of the banks with perennial plantings along the streams near the diesel power plant was carried out in 1954 for the exhibition Green and Blooming on the Spree. Carl Blechen Park, with rare trees and flowering perennials on the east bank of the Spree, was created in the 1930s. Its promenade, built in 1934 and 1935, was extended southwards as the "Rosenufer", today's Ludwig-Leichhardt-Allee.

==== Elias Park and Spreeauen Park ====
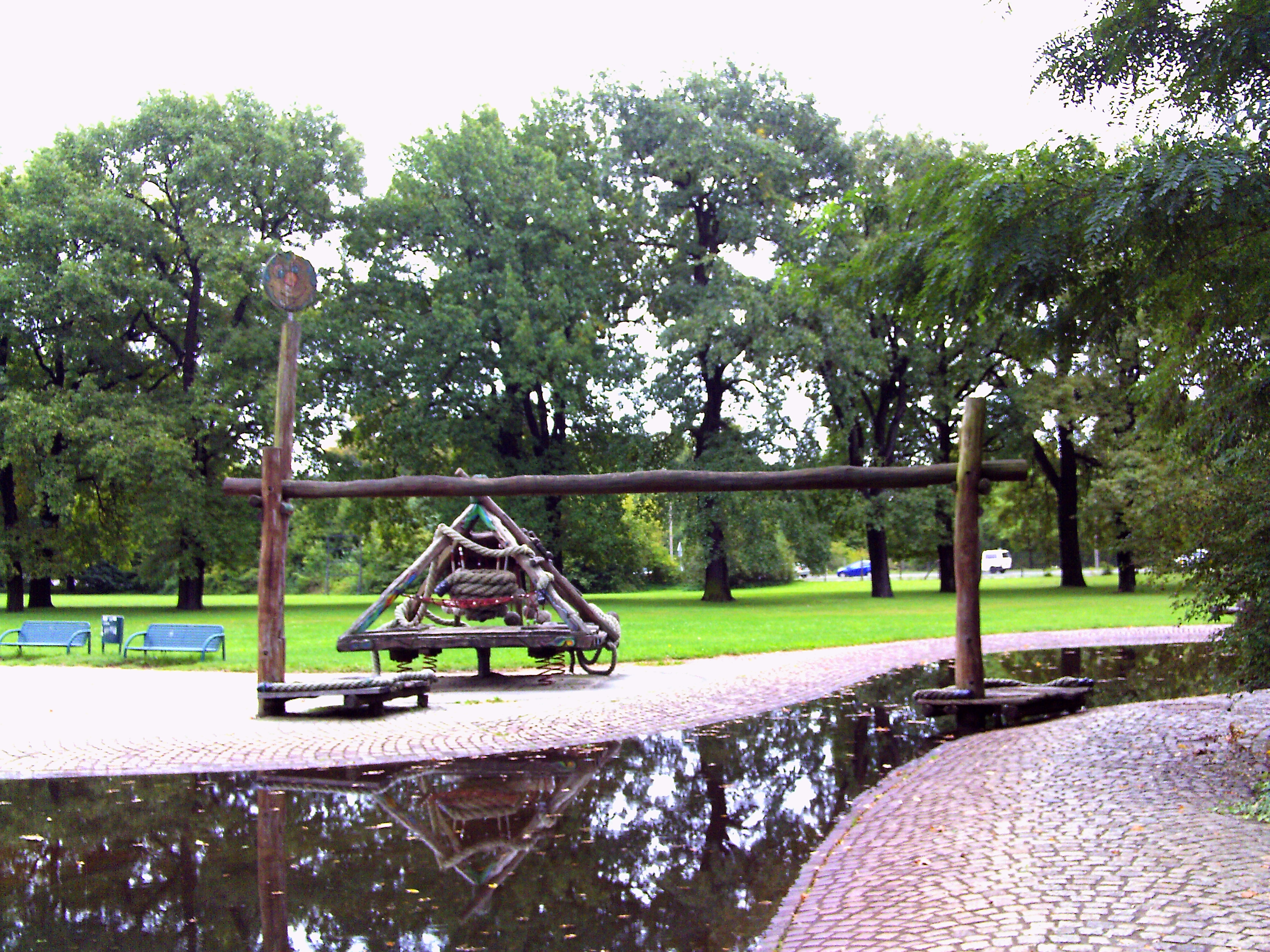
Playground in Elias Park

Elias Park was created in 1902 through a donation from the commercial councilor Elias. This three-and-a-half-hectare park was redesigned as part of the first Federal Garden Show in the new states in 1995. The much larger Spreeauen Park, covering 55 hectares, was only created in the run-up to the Federal Garden Show 1995. Amid meadows and under shady trees, new paths, play and sports facilities, a water playground, and the playhouse as a meeting place for children and young people were built. Since the BUGA, the Spreeauen Park has delighted millions of visitors. Around the 1.2-hectare park pond, there is a rose garden, a rhododendron grove, meadow landscapes with changing plantings, and an apothecary and farm garden. For connoisseurs, the Tertiary Forest, with plants and trees from various geological epochs, boulders from the Ice Age, and a fossilized mammoth tree stump, is a special attraction.

==== Zoo ====
Opened in 1954, Cottbus Zoo today borders Spreeauen Park and Branitz Park. With more than 1,200 animals in over 170 species from all continents, it is the largest zoological garden in Brandenburg, known in particular for breeding waterfowl. With support from the city of Cottbus, various companies, and the Zoo Friends Association (founded in 1994), the zoo is constantly being modernized and expanded. In summer 2014, construction was completed on a new predator enclosure, intended as the home for Sumatran tigers.

=== Sport ===
==== Clubs ====
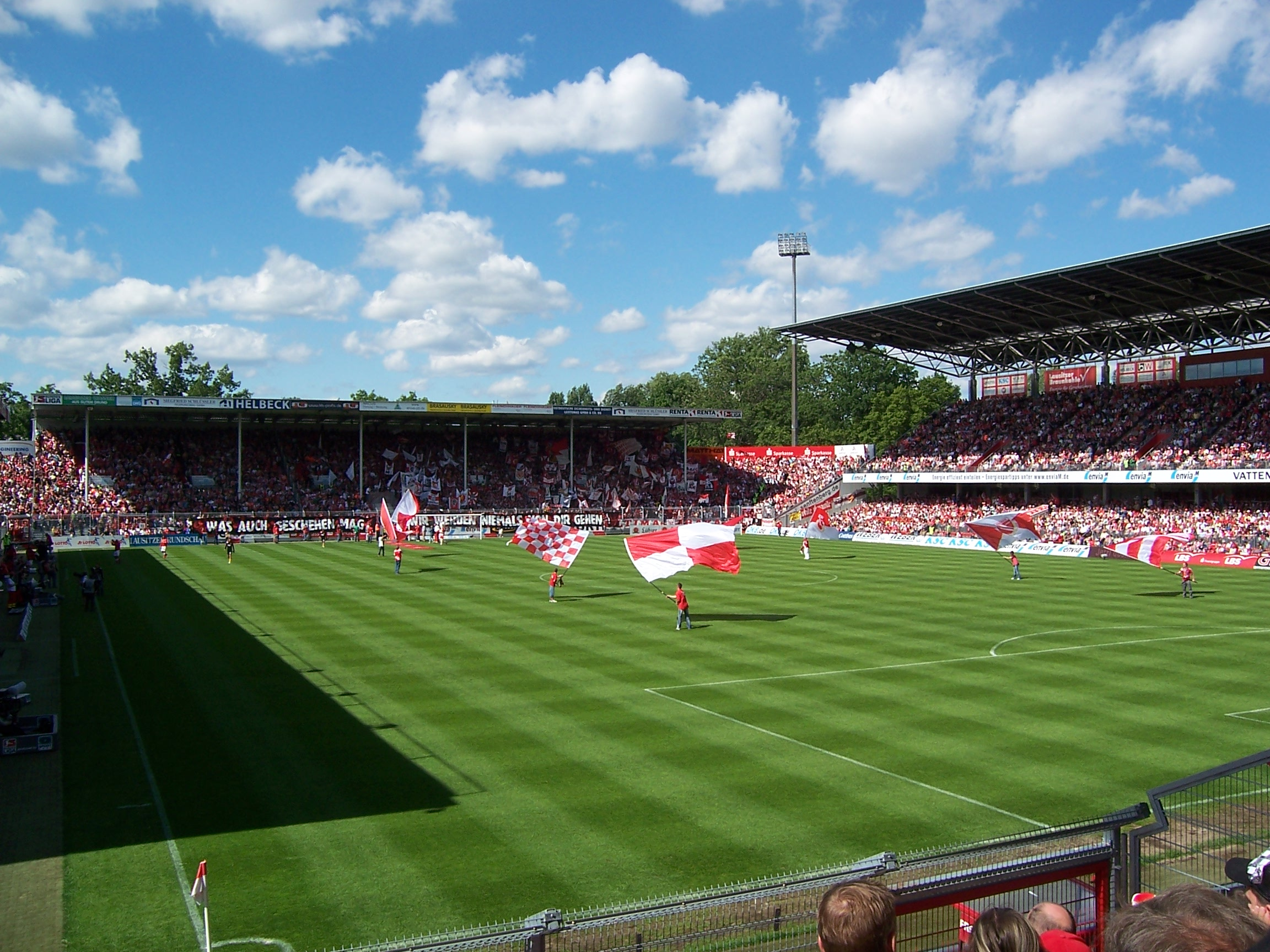
LEAG Energie Stadium (formerly Stadium of Friendship)

By far the best-known club in the city is Energie Cottbus (football). The FCE, active in the 3rd division from the 2024/25 season, achieved promotion to the Bundesliga in the 1999/2000 season and managed to stay up twice, but was relegated to the 2nd Bundesliga in the 2002/03 season. In the 2005/06 season, the club was again promoted to the Bundesliga, from which it was relegated again in the 2008/09 season. The LEAG Energie Stadium (until the end of 2023 Stadium of Friendship; German: Stadion der Freundschaft) currently has a capacity of 22,528 spectators. It offers 10,949 covered seats, 7,795 covered and 3,630 uncovered standing places, as well as 154 places in the wheelchair-accessible section. After the Cottbus team had in the meantime been relegated to the fourth-tier Regionalliga Nordost, promotion to the 3rd division in 2024 marked their return to professional football.

Other larger clubs include HSV Cottbus (volleyball, karate – Brandenburg state performance center, judo, health sports, strength sports, lacrosse), which emerged from a new foundation in 2004 from the former USV university sports club, the handball club LHC Cottbus, which played in the 2nd Handball Bundesliga in the 2007/2008 season, the White Devils (basketball), the Cottbus Crayfish (American football), the Crabettes (cheerleading), as well as the 1st women's team of SV Energie Cottbus (volleyball), which played in the 2nd Bundesliga North in the 2023/24 season. The cycling club RSC Cottbus has produced numerous world champions and Olympic champions.

In total, there are more than 145 sports clubs in Cottbus, offering around 70 different sports. The four umbrella organizations in the city are PSV Cottbus 90 e. V., SCC Breitensport e. V., Stadtsportbund Cottbus e. V., and Versehrtensportgemeinschaft Cottbus e. V.

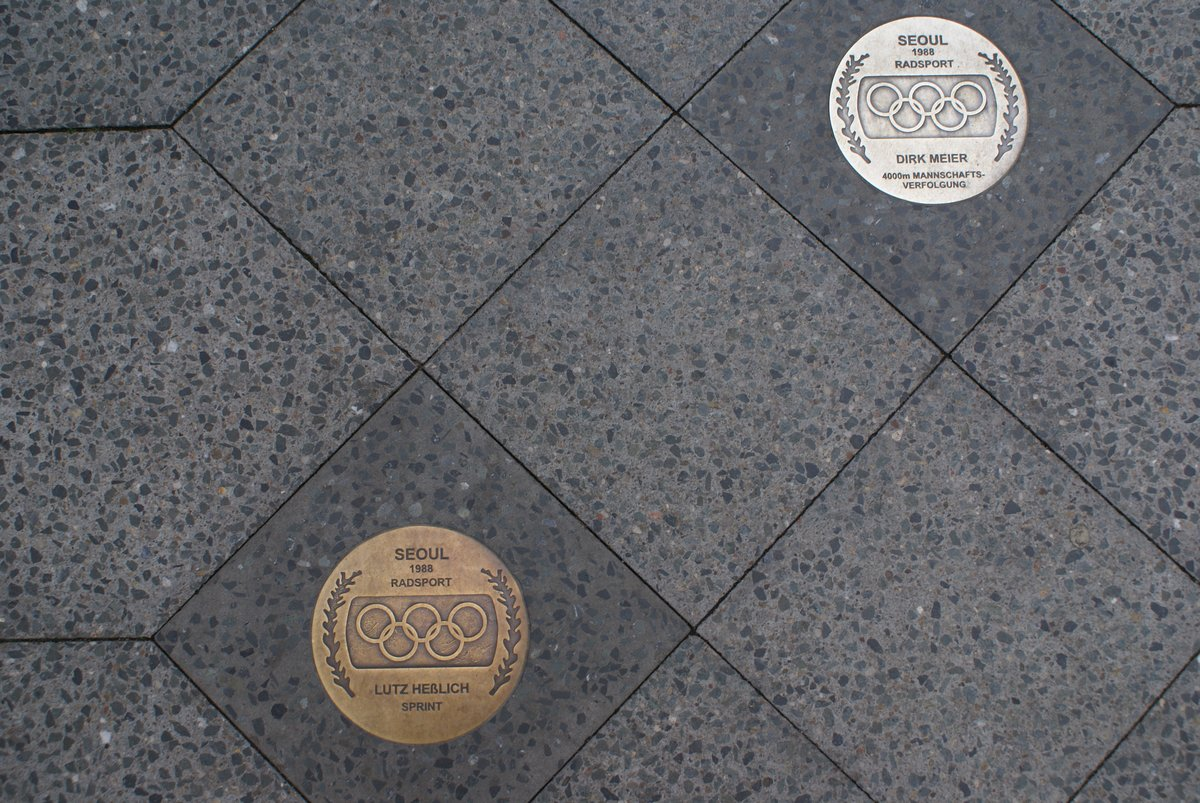
Medals on the "Walk of Fame"

On the Walk of Fame in front of the New Town Hall, the medal winners of the Olympic and Paralympic Games are honored. After the Games in Paris, there are now 76 honorary plaques embedded in the ground there.

==== Sports facilities ====
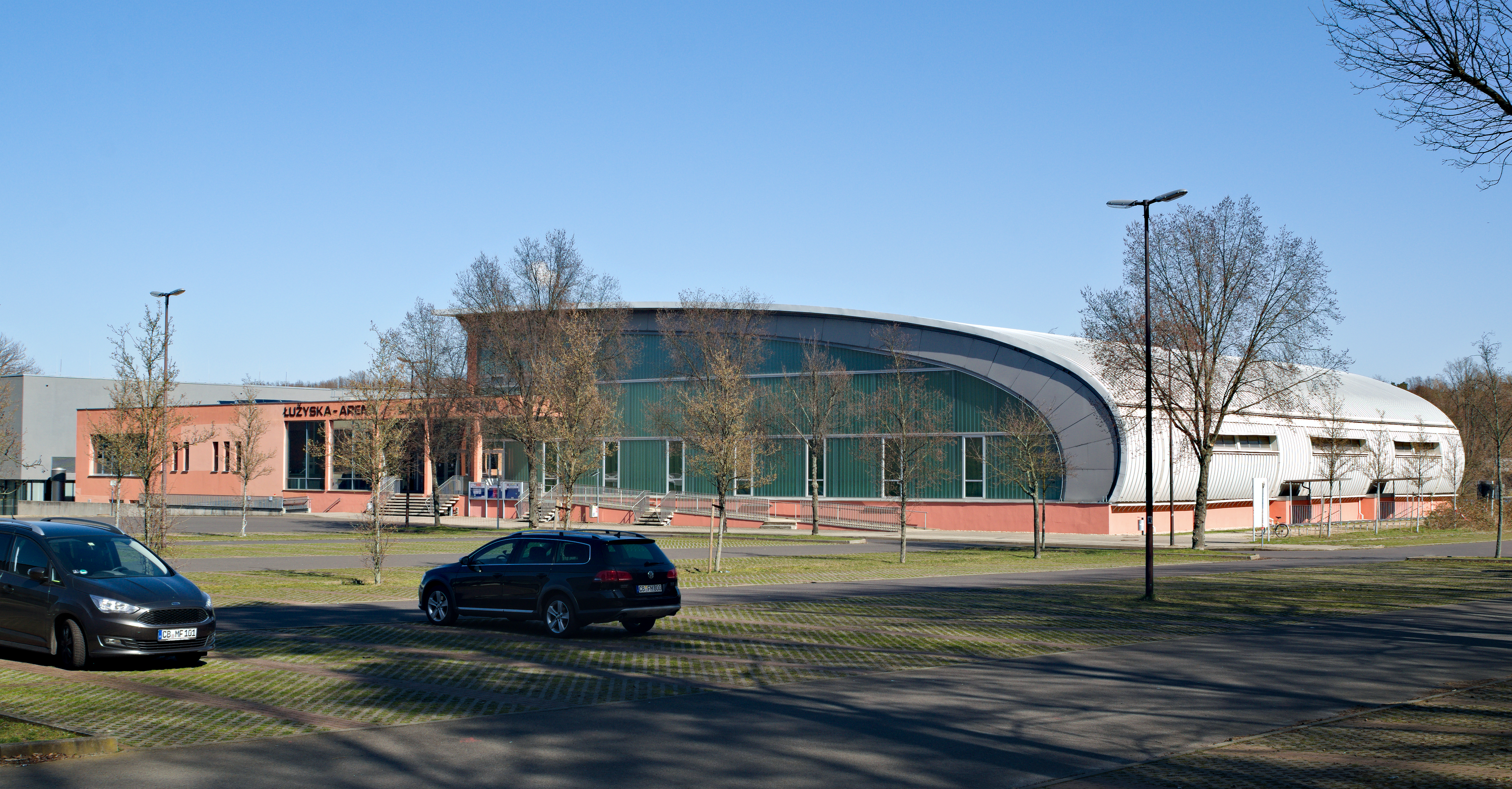
Sports venue Lausitz-Arena at Sportzentrum

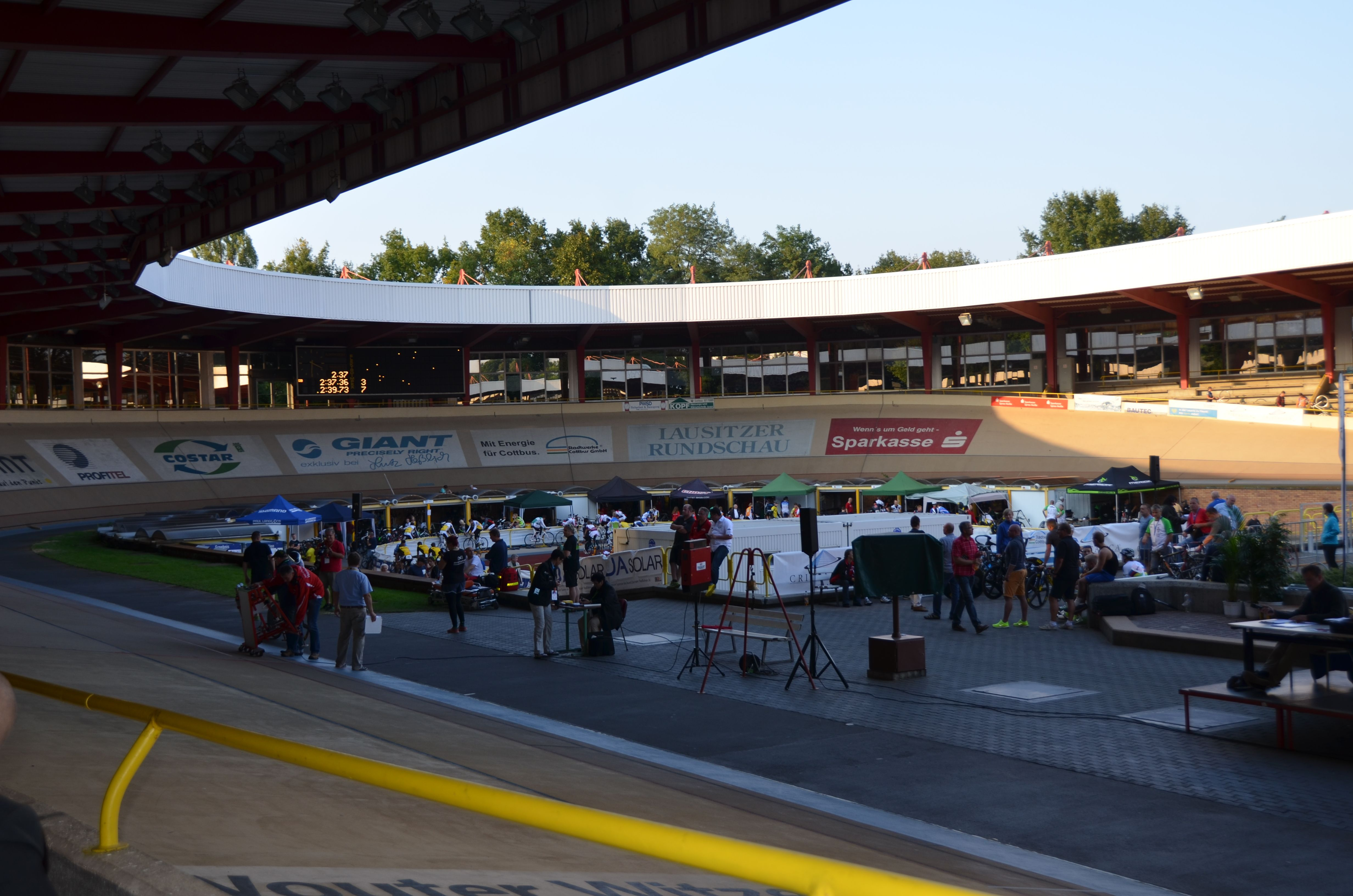
Cottbus Velodrome

Cottbus is an Olympic training center for the sports of cycling, gymnastics, men's football, athletics, men's handball, and women's volleyball. For active recreational sports, there are 50 sports halls, 49 sports fields and stadiums, 20 tennis courts, 70 bowling lanes, five shooting ranges, four bathing lakes, an equestrian facility, a swimming hall with an outdoor pool, and a boathouse available to all interested parties.

Since 2013, a Paralympic training center for athletics with disabled-accessible training facilities has also been established.

The sports center, managed by the city's sports facilities department, is one of the largest and most modern sports complexes in the South Brandenburg region. It is used for children's and youth sports, junior and elite sports, as well as recreational and disabled sports. The complex includes the Max-Reimann Stadium, an athletics stadium that meets all international requirements, and the Cottbus Velodrome, with its covered cycle track, where national and international competitions have been held to great acclaim, for example, the Track Cycling World Cup in 1995 and 1996. In addition, there is an athletics hall, two gymnasiums, two football pitches, and a boxing hall on the site. The Lausitz Arena is also part of the complex, a multi-purpose sports hall for around 2,000 spectators.

==== One-time sporting events ====
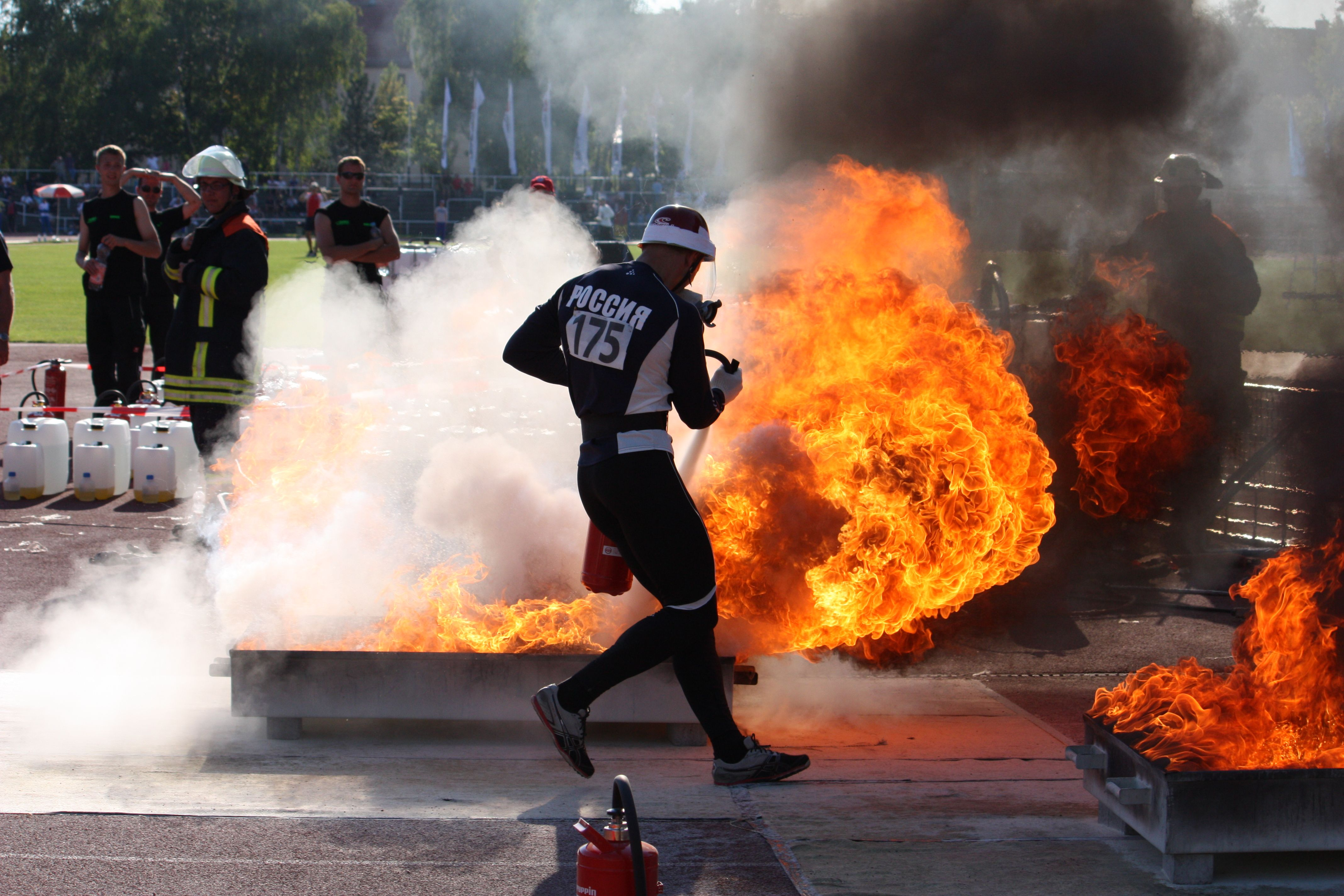
- Firefighting World Championships 2011 at the Cottbus Sports Center
  2010: DFB Futsal Cup, final city in the Mission Olympic city competition
- 2011: 7th World Championship in Firefighting Sports
- 2013: 64th National Cycling Meeting, Women's Football World Cup Qualifying Match (Germany – Russia)

==== Regular sporting events ====
Start and finish of the Lausitz City Run 2006

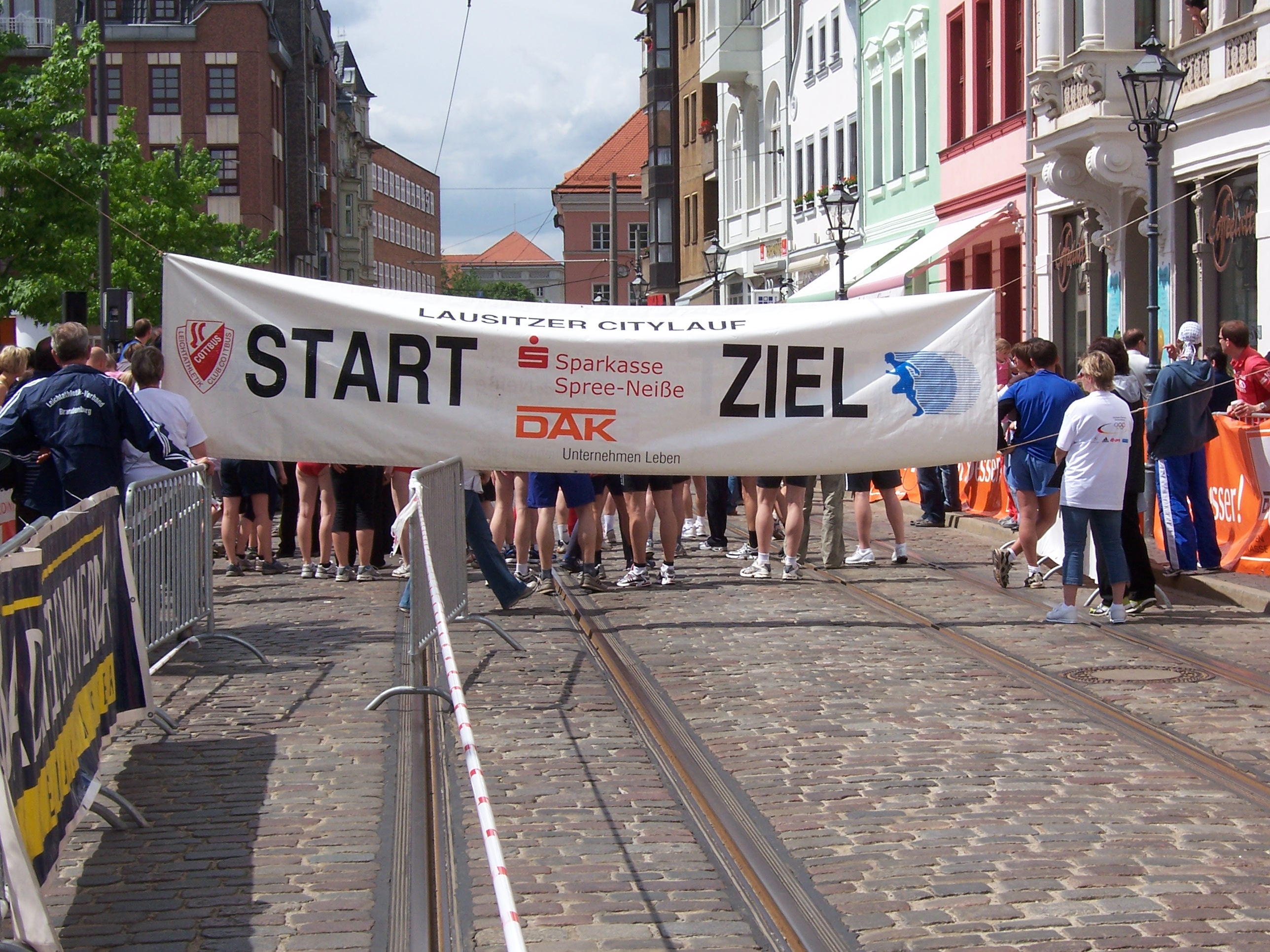
Start and finish of the Lausitz City Run 2006

At the "Tournament of Masters" – the highest-quality sporting event in the state of Brandenburg – around 200 gymnasts from about 40 nations compete annually in artistic gymnastics for the coveted titles at the FIG World Cup.

In summer, from 1991 to 2011, the Cottbus Sports Center hosted the International Lausitz Athletics Meeting, at which new records in athletics disciplines were regularly set. The men's meeting record in the 100-meter run is 10.00 seconds, for women it is 11.14 seconds. Since 2003, the International Springer Meeting has been held annually at the end of January, featuring the women's high jump (meeting record 2.01 m) and men's pole vault (meeting record 5.90 m). Other athletics events in Cottbus include the Lausitz City Run (2017 AOK City Run@Bike) and the Spreewald Marathon.

Since 1999, the 24-hour swimming event has been a permanent fixture in the city's sports calendar. It is traditionally held in November by the German Life Saving Association Cottbus. With 2,143 participants in 2019, it is one of the largest mass sports events in water sports nationwide. During the 2018 event, a total of almost 5,500 kilometers were swum.

With the dragon boat regatta on the Spree, the DAK Company Run, the Beach Volleyball Cup at BTU, and the spring cycling event, other popular sports events have also been established in Cottbus.

=== Regular events ===
==== Fairs and exhibitions ====
The fairs and exhibitions take place at Messe Cottbus, with multifunctional exhibition areas of 6,500 m^{2}. The exhibition center is conveniently located on the city ring road and in the immediate vicinity of the Spreeauenpark.

Every year in January, the "Cottbus Travel Market" takes place. This fair offers products and services related to vacations, tourism, leisure, caravans, camping, and boats. With up to 250 exhibitors and 15,000 visitors, this exhibition is among the largest in Cottbus. Parallel to it, the "Fit+Healthy" exhibition is held every year, dedicated to topics related to wellness, spa treatments, and health. At the end of January, the exhibition center annually hosts a craft exhibition. This is the only exhibition dedicated to crafts in southern Brandenburg.

The "Impuls" fair, held every year in February, deals with education, further training, business start-ups, business security, and employment. In March, the "Cars & Bikes" exhibition takes place in the exhibition halls. This is the largest automobile and two-wheeler exhibition in the state of Brandenburg. With 27,000 visitors in 2005, this exhibition was the most visited since the Federal Garden Show in 1995. At the Tattoo Convention, international artists showcase their skills. The "CottbusBau" exhibition is also held regularly in March; it is the largest construction trade fair in the state of Brandenburg.

In October, Cottbus hosts the Autumn Fair. With more than 330 exhibitors, this is the most visited consumer exhibition in the state of Brandenburg.

Other events at the exhibition center include the Vital & Co. exhibition and the Erotic Fair.

==== Major events and carnival ====
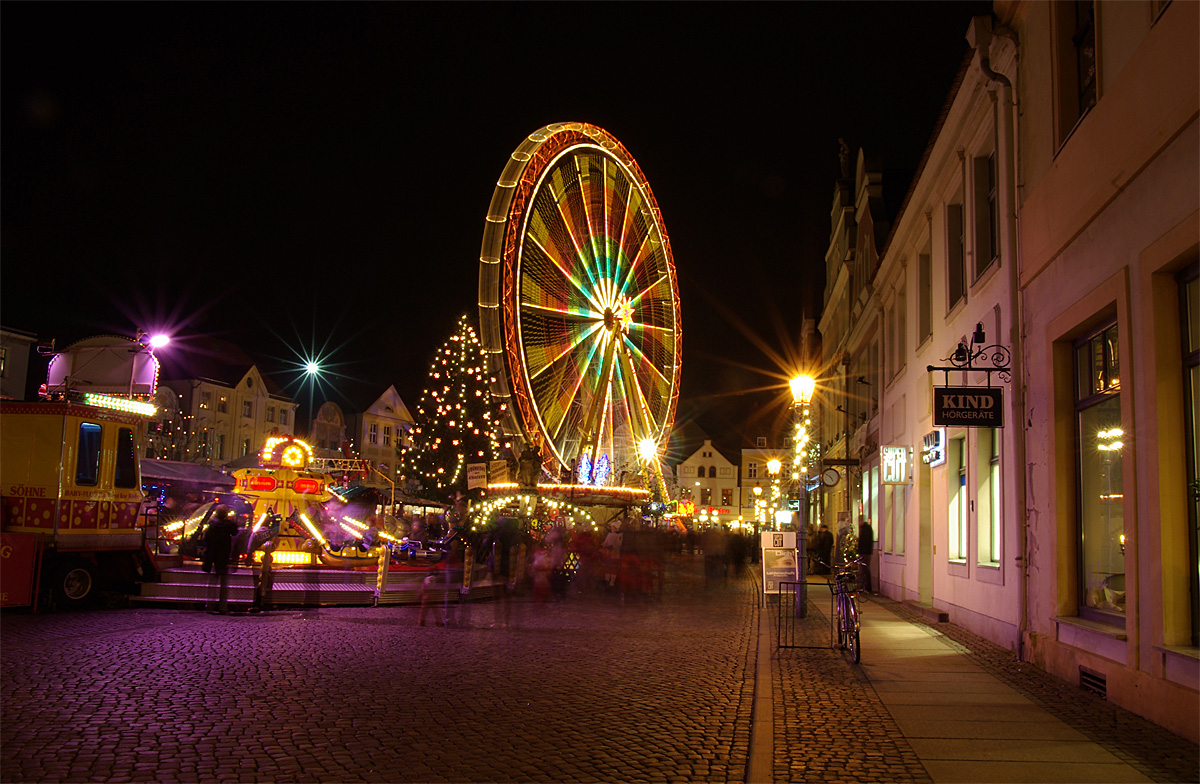
Christmas market in Cottbus

The major events held annually include, among others, the student satire festival Ei(n)fälle (January), the Old Town Night (April), the Cottbus Environmental Week (May/June), the Night of Open Churches (Pentecost), the City Festival (June), the Spreeauen Night (August), the Day of Associations (August/September), the Pottery Festival (September), the Lusatian Farmers' Market (September/October), the Night of Creative Minds (October), the FilmFestival Cottbus – Festival of Eastern European Film (November), as well as the Christmas Market (December).

Every Tulip Sunday (February/March), the Zug der fröhlichen Leute (Parade of Cheerful People) — the largest carnival parade in eastern Germany — takes place. Numerous themed floats, bands, and dance groups from carnival clubs in Cottbus and the surrounding area attract around 100,000 visitors each year. The annual carnival gala Heut steppt der Adler (Today the Eagle Dances) recorded by Rundfunk Berlin-Brandenburg, also takes place in the city hall.

=== Education and research ===
==== General education schools ====
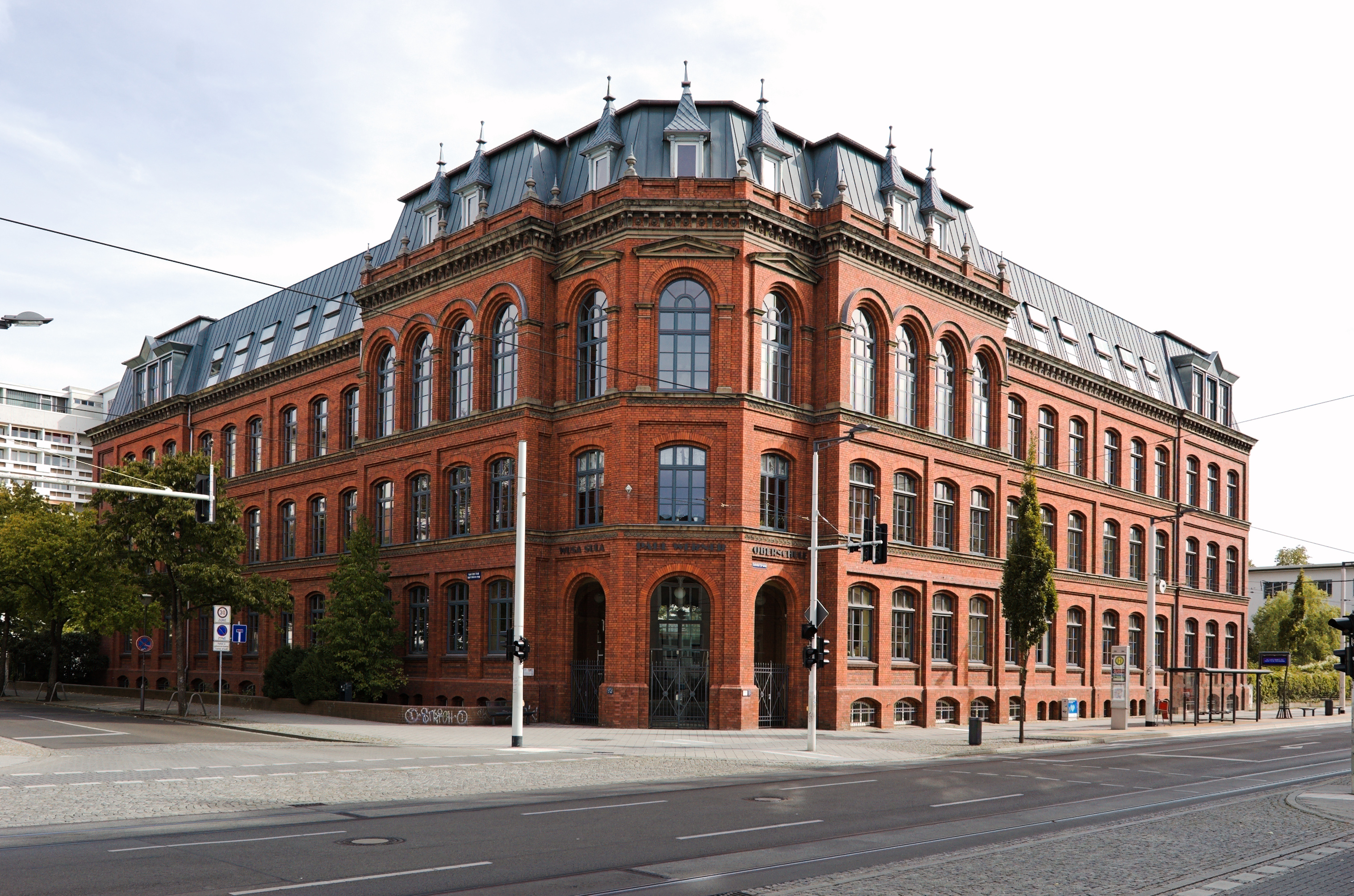
Secondary school Paul-Werner-Oberschule

In the 2013/2014 school year, the city had twelve primary schools, two secondary schools, two comprehensive schools, five grammar schools, three special needs schools, and one upper secondary center, all under municipal sponsorship, attended by 9,835 students. In addition, there are other private schools, including a Waldorf school and the Evangelical Gymnasium.

Furthermore, the Pückler Gymnasium and the Upper Secondary Center II Spree-Neiße are two additional public schools in the urban area, under the sponsorship of the Spree-Neiße district.

==== Brandenburg University of Technology Cottbus–Senftenberg ====
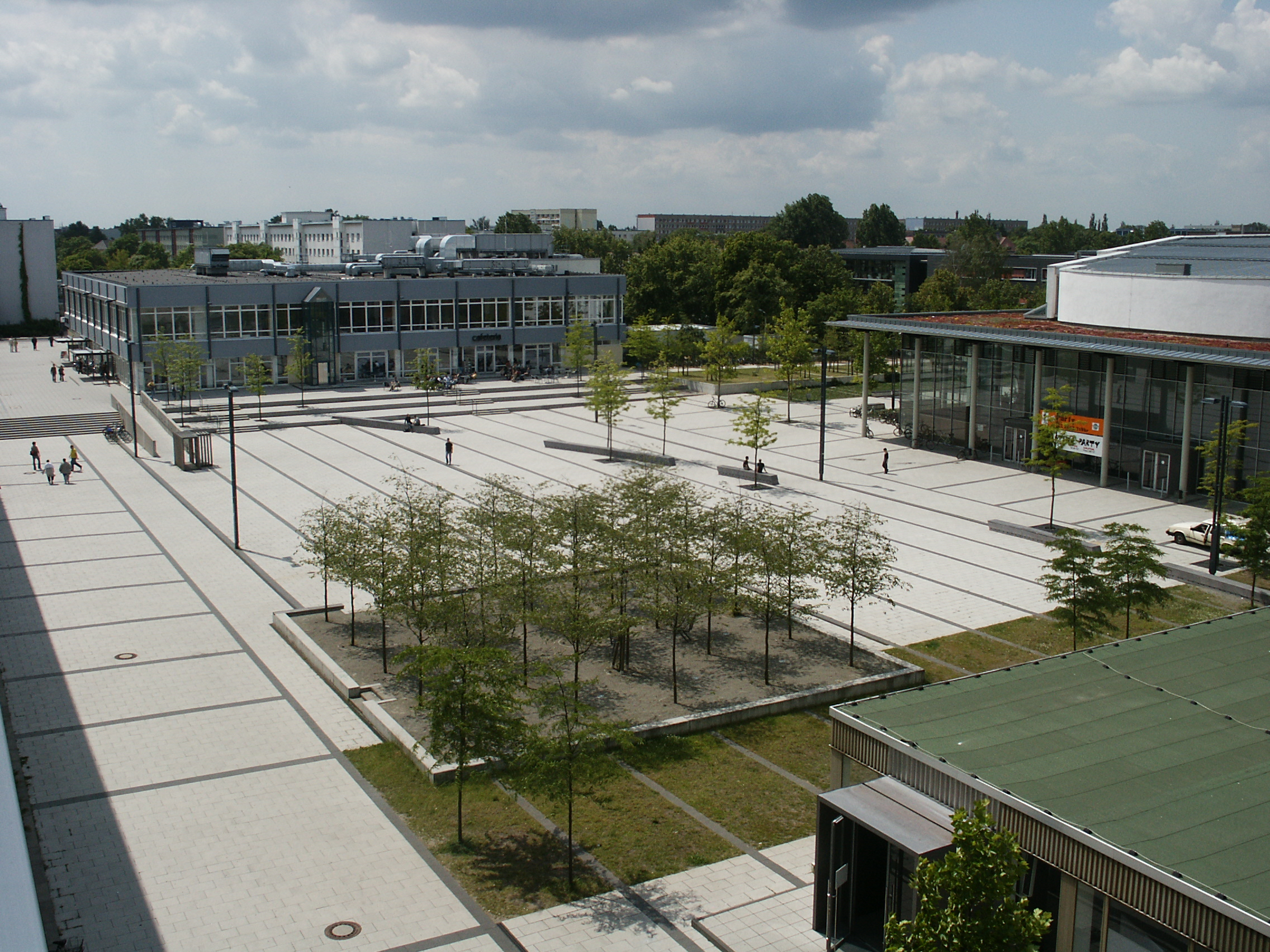
View from the main building of the university to the central square on the campus

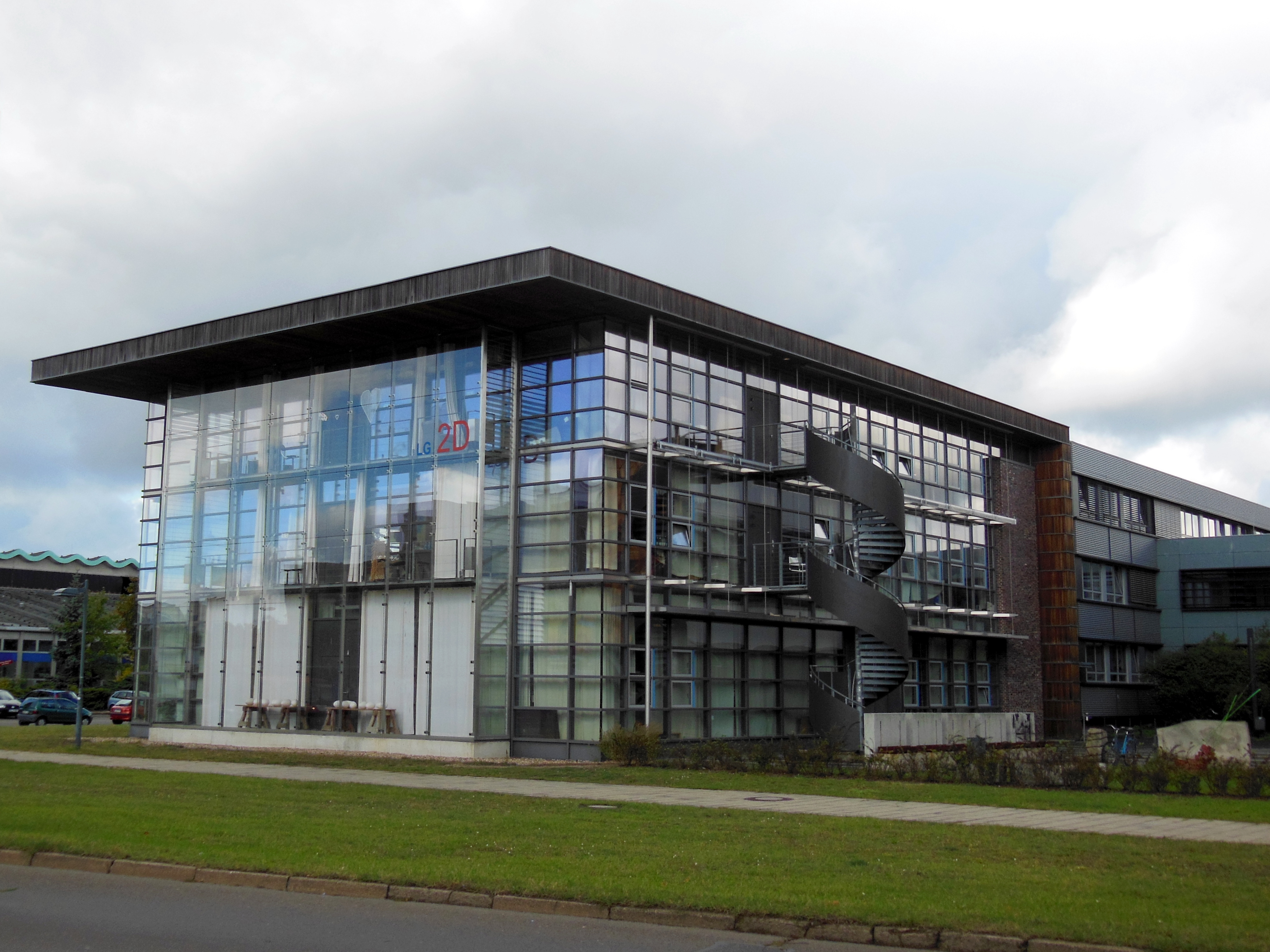
BTU teaching building on the central campus

In Cottbus, following the merger of the Brandenburg University of Technology Cottbus and the Lausitz University of Applied Sciences on 1 July 2013, the Brandenburg University of Technology Cottbus–Senftenberg (BTU) was established as a public university. Birger Hendriks, a higher education expert, was appointed as the commissioner for the founding. One problem is the overall decline in student numbers, which is not compensated by more international students. In 2020, Gesine Grande was elected by the senate as the new president of BTU Cottbus–Senftenberg. In the coalition agreement of the "traffic light" coalition in 2021, the establishment of a medical faculty in Cottbus was stipulated as compensation for the phase-out of coal mining.

==== Other educational institutions ====
For teacher training, the Kingdom of Prussia founded a preparatory institution with a teacher training seminar in 1907. The city constructed a school building and director's villas based on designs by Arno Pasig. On 25 June 1910, the teacher training seminar was inaugurated, operating until 1925. After renovations, a Pedagogical Academy opened in 1930, renamed the College for Teacher Education in 1933, and downgraded to a Teacher Training Institute in 1941.

After the war-damaged school building was restored, the Pedagogical Institute, a training facility for new teachers in the GDR, was located there for a few years. As the center of the bilingual region in Lower Lusatia, Cottbus was also to receive a Sorbian secondary school, which opened on 1 September 1952, with 46 students in the building. In 1960, this became the Sorbian Extended Secondary School, and after 1990, it finally became the Lower Sorbian Gymnasium.

In addition, there is a technical school for business, an adult education center, and the School for Lower Sorbian Language and Culture.

A medical school at the Carl-Thiem Clinic, which was initially a teaching hospital of the Berlin Charité, also existed and became part of the newly established Medical University of Lusatia in 2024.

=== Libraries ===
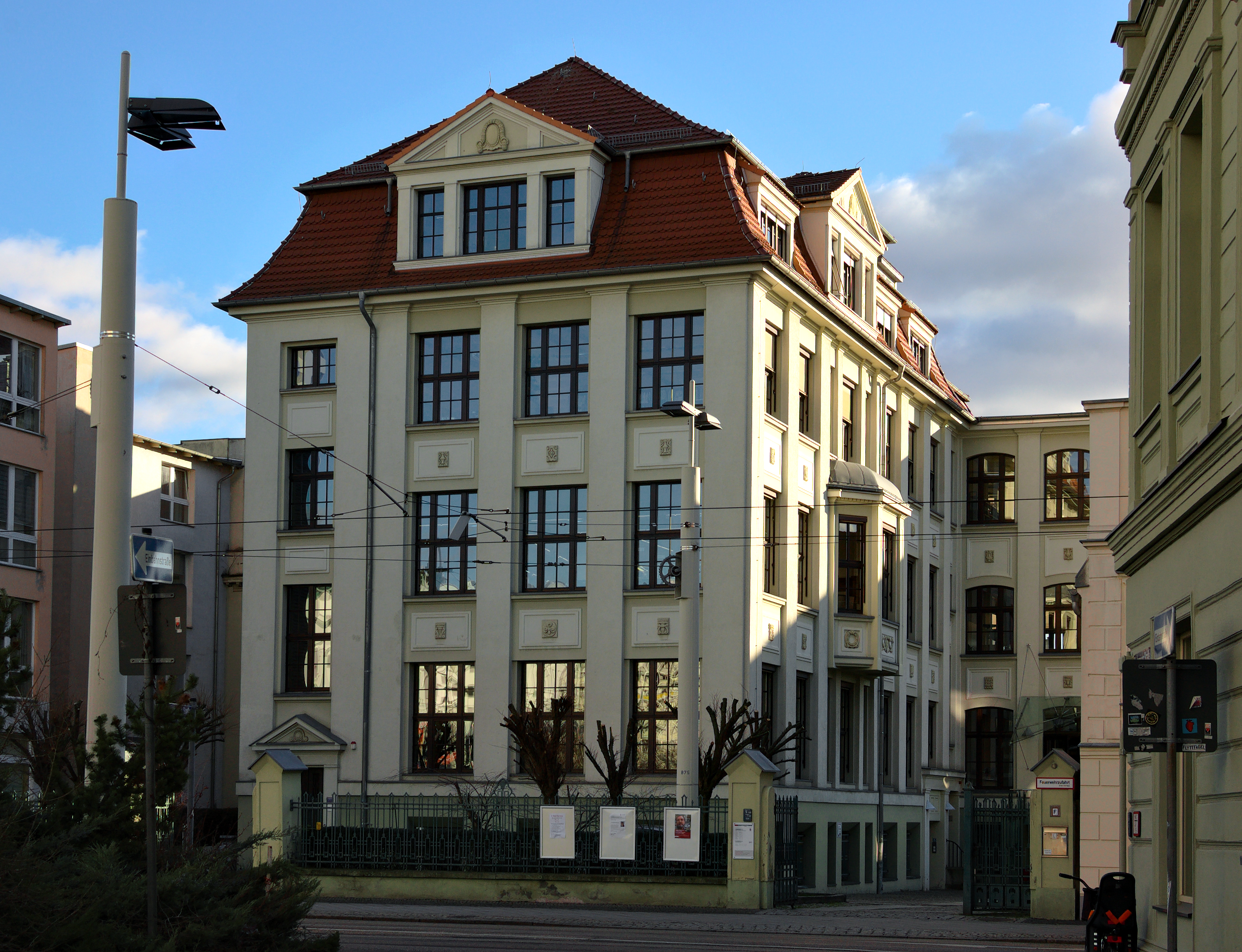
The main public library of Cottbus, Berliner Straße 13/14

Public libraries in the city include the City and Regional Library on Berliner Straße (Lower Sorbian: Barlinska droga), with a media collection of over 250,000 items as of June 2005, and the Sandow Library Association with around 7,500 items.

In addition, the BTU maintains its own university libraries through the Information, Communication, and Media Center (IKMZ) with over 890,000 media items, around 80,000 items at the Sachsendorf campus, and approximately 100,000 items at the Senftenberg campus. There are also other specialized and government libraries, such as those of the Carl-Thiem Clinic, the State Office for Occupational Safety, and the Finance Court of Berlin-Brandenburg.

Other notable libraries include the Pückler Library at Branitz Castle, a reference-only library focusing on literature by and about Pückler, garden and travel literature, art and cultural history of the 19th and 20th centuries, German history of the 19th century, and regional history, as well as the Lower Sorbian Library, with collections focusing on the history, language, art, and culture of the Sorbs.

== Economy and transportation ==
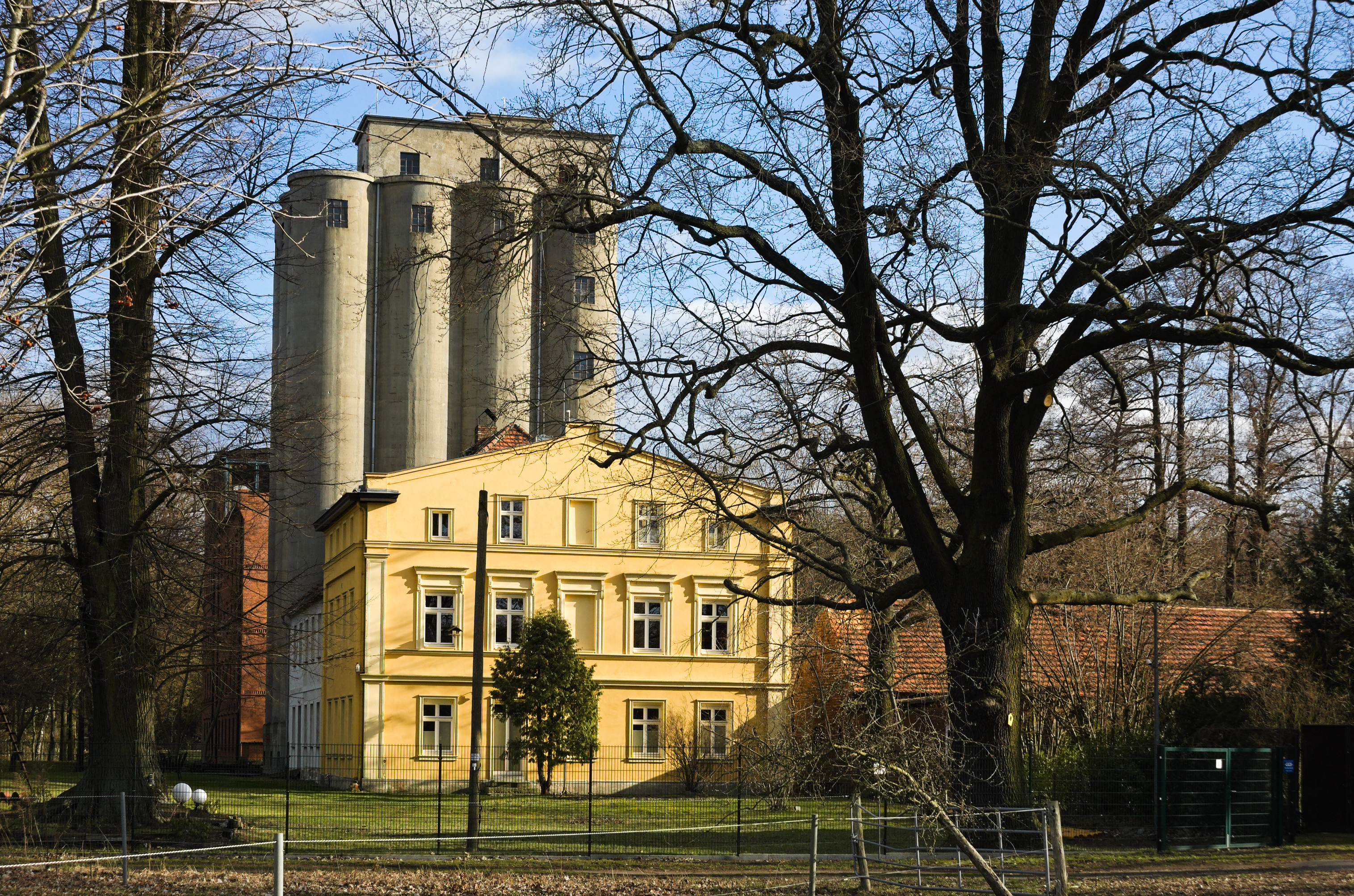
Grain silo and auxiliary buildings of Große Mühle Madlow

In 2016, Cottbus generated a gross domestic product (GDP) of €3.308 billion within its city limits. The GDP per capita in the same year was €33,067 (Brandenburg: €26,887, Germany: €38,180), thus above the regional but below the national average. GDP per employed person amounted to €52,747. In 2016, the city's GDP grew nominally by 2.5 percent, compared to 4.3 percent in the previous year. In 2016, about 62,700 people were employed in the city. With €158.9 million in 2020, Cottbus had the highest debt of all municipalities in Brandenburg.

=== Local businesses ===
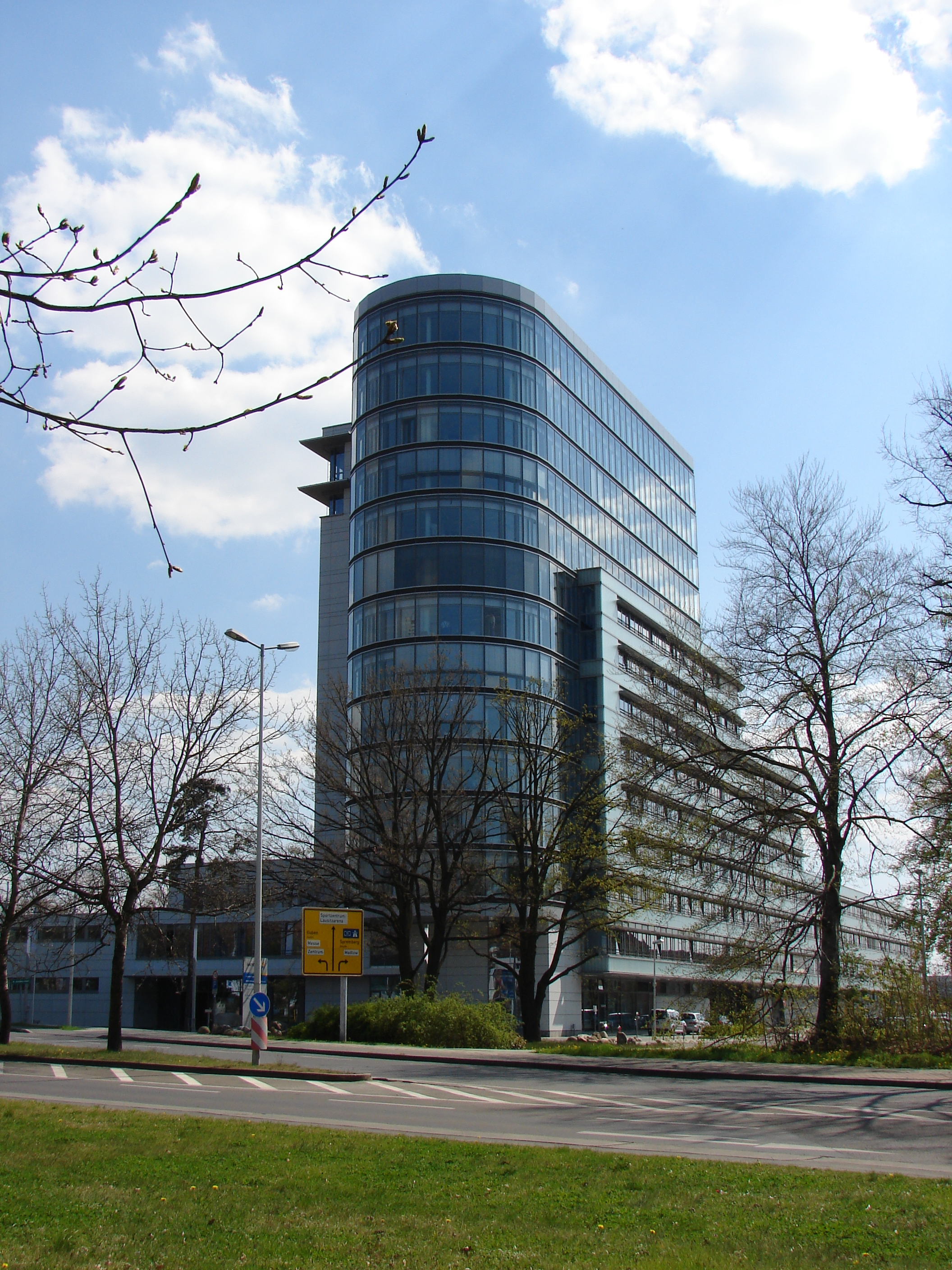
Headquarters of Lausitz Energie Bergbau AG and Lausitz Energie Kraftwerke AG

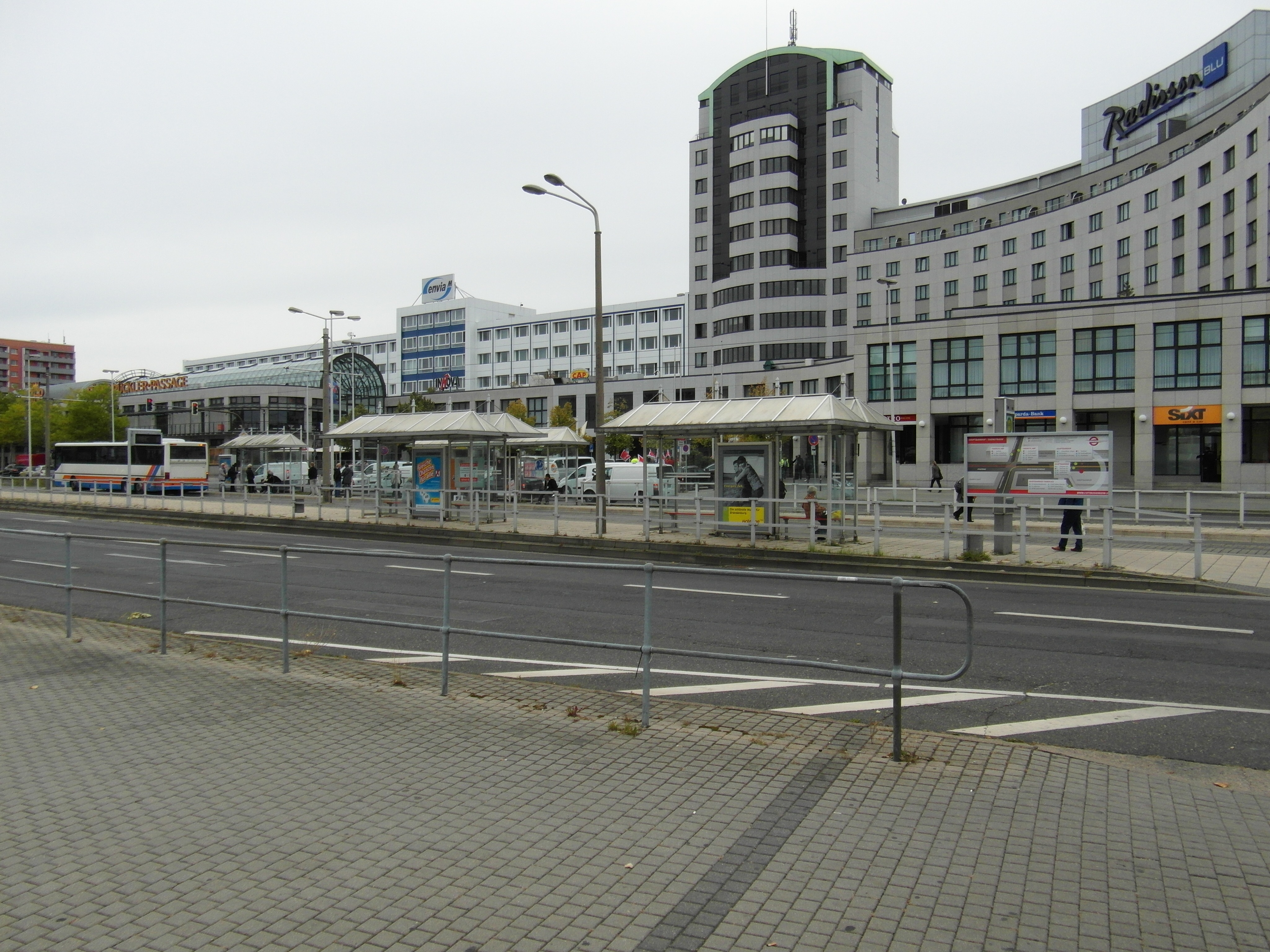
Administration building of Envia Mitteldeutsche Energie AG

A variety of companies are based in Cottbus. The largest employer is LEAG, which manages open-pit mines and power plants in eastern Germany from its Cottbus headquarters. The second-largest employer is Carl-Thiem-Klinikum Cottbus gGmbH. The electrical engineering group ABB is also based in Cottbus. The regional energy and communications provider Envia Mitteldeutsche Energie AG also has a location in the city. Deutsche Post AG operates one of its 82 mail centers in Germany here. In addition, the Sparkasse Spree-Neiße and VR Bank Lausitz are headquartered in Cottbus.

Deutsche Bahn operates a vehicle maintenance plant in the city. On 11 January 2024, after 20 months of construction, it also opened Hall 2 with two tracks of an ICE maintenance facility in Cottbus. By 2026, Hall 1 with five tracks and additional buildings are to be completed, creating a total of 1,200 new jobs.

Other companies in the city primarily come from the fields of architecture, chemistry and pharmaceuticals, services, energy, finance, research, healthcare, trade, mechanical engineering, and telecommunications. The branch of the Galeria Kaufhof department store chain in the former Konsument department store closed at the end of June 2023. The city administration decided to purchase the property and put it to new uses, possibly housing the city and regional library and, if applicable, the Cottbus citizens' service center. A branch of the Aachener fashion department store closed again after just under nine months.

In addition to ground-mounted photovoltaic plants with 91 MW (including on the former Cottbus-Nord airfield and south of Dissenchen), there is 33 MW of PV capacity on rooftops (as of 15 February 2023), and for 2024, the construction of Germany's largest floating photovoltaic plant, with 29 MW, is planned on Lake Cottbus.

Cottbus is one of 15 "regional growth centers" in the state of Brandenburg, which means that selected forward-looking industries receive special support.

As of 31 December 2024, there were 48,233 employees in Cottbus: 43,029 in the service sector, 5,129 in manufacturing, and 75 in agriculture, forestry, and fishing. In the service sector, 10,023 jobs were in trade, transport, and hospitality; 6,233 in public administration; 5,403 in healthcare; 4,216 in real estate and technical services; 2,770 in education and teaching; 856 in information and communication technology; 779 in finance and insurance services; and 5,071 in other services. In manufacturing, 2,431 people were employed in construction and 1,709 in processing industries.

As of December 2024, the unemployment rate was 7.8 percent (3,938 unemployed persons), above the state average of 6.2 percent.

=== Transportation ===
==== Road transport ====
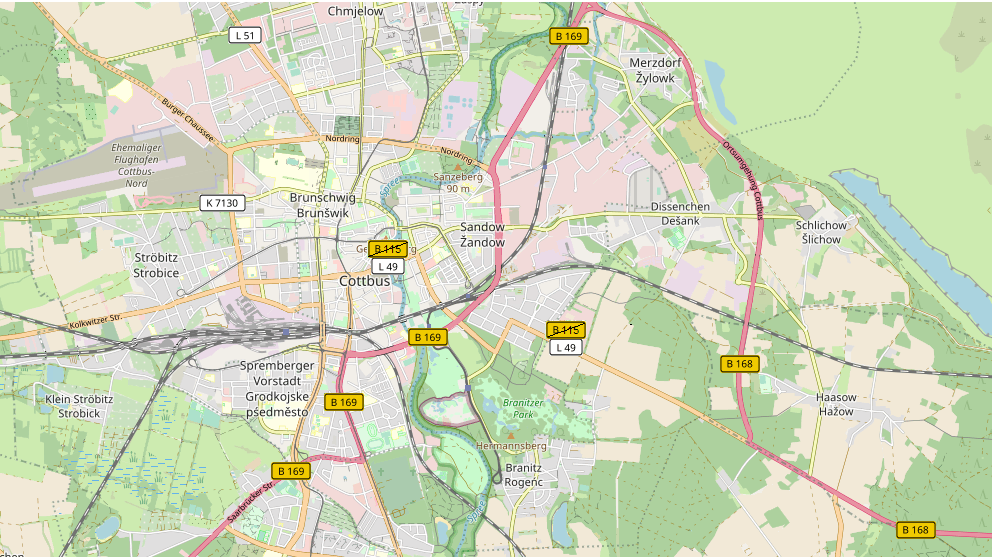
Map of the road network

The southern part of Cottbus is crossed by the federal motorway A15, which runs from the Spreewald interchange (A13 Dresden–Berlin) and, as part of the European route E36, continues toward Poland/Ukraine. The motorway has four lanes and two exits in Cottbus: Cottbus-West and Cottbus-South. Cottbus is also crossed by federal highways B97, B168, and B169, with the B169 forming the southern and eastern part of the city ring road. Until the end of 2004, federal highway B115 also ran through Cottbus; today, it is designated as L49 and runs through the city center.

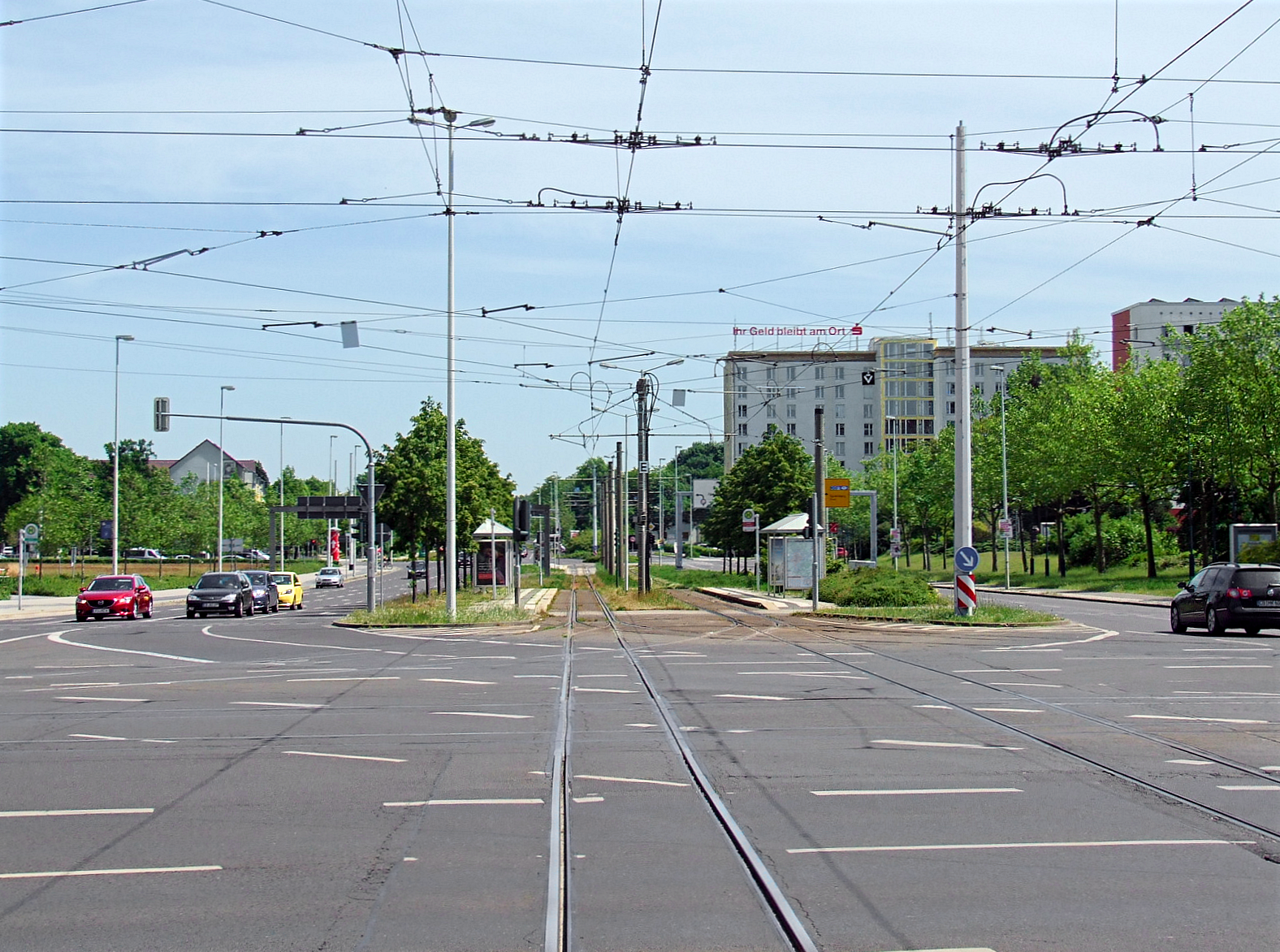
Western terminus of the Stadtring (four-lane local bypass), looking east towards the intersection with Straße der Jugend

A bypass in the eastern part of the city, currently in planning and under construction, is to be formed by the B97n and B168n. It is intended to keep most heavy goods traffic and through traffic out of the city center. The first section of the bypass, 6.7 km long and running from Peitz to the L49 in Kahren, was opened on 3 September 2012. Construction of the second section, including the Kahren bypass and the planned Cottbus-East interchange with the A15, began in 2021 and is scheduled for completion by 2025. A third section is planned to run outside the city limits from the interchange southwards, joining the B97 north of Groß Oßnig. Whether this third section will actually be built has not yet been finally decided.

The density of private passenger cars is significantly below the Brandenburg average (2014: 510 per 1,000 inhabitants). Despite the declining population, the number of registered passenger cars has hardly changed. Private motorization has increased, although less strongly than the state average.

Private motorization in Cottbus	2010	2012	2014	2016	2018	2020	2022
Privately registered passenger cars (as of Jan 1)	42.162	42.629	42.532	42.853	43.270	43.449	43.640
Cars per 1,000 inhabitants (as of Dec 31 previous year)	415	426	427	430	428	436	444

==== Rail transport ====
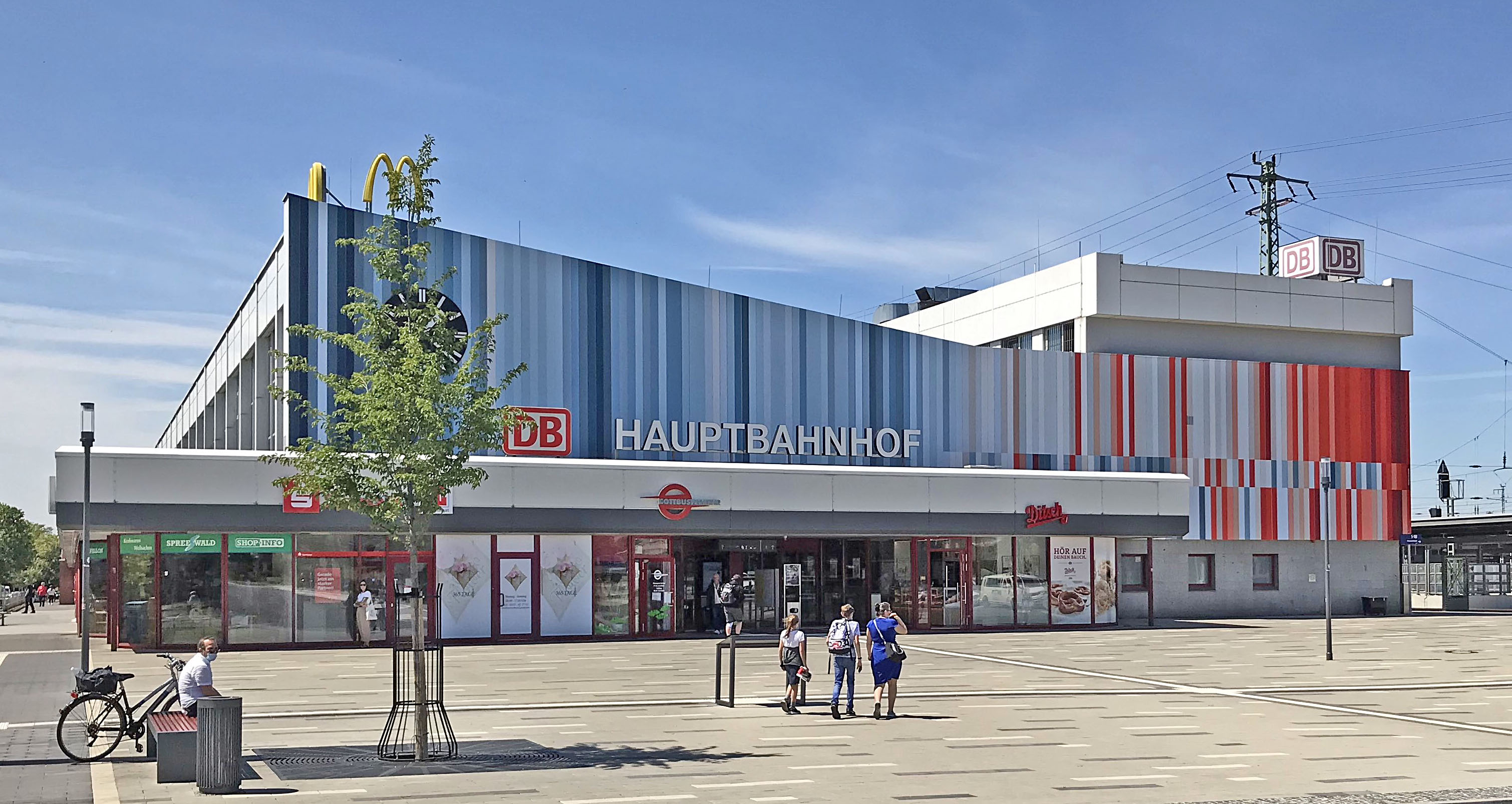
Cottbus station forecourt with newly designed façade (June 2020)

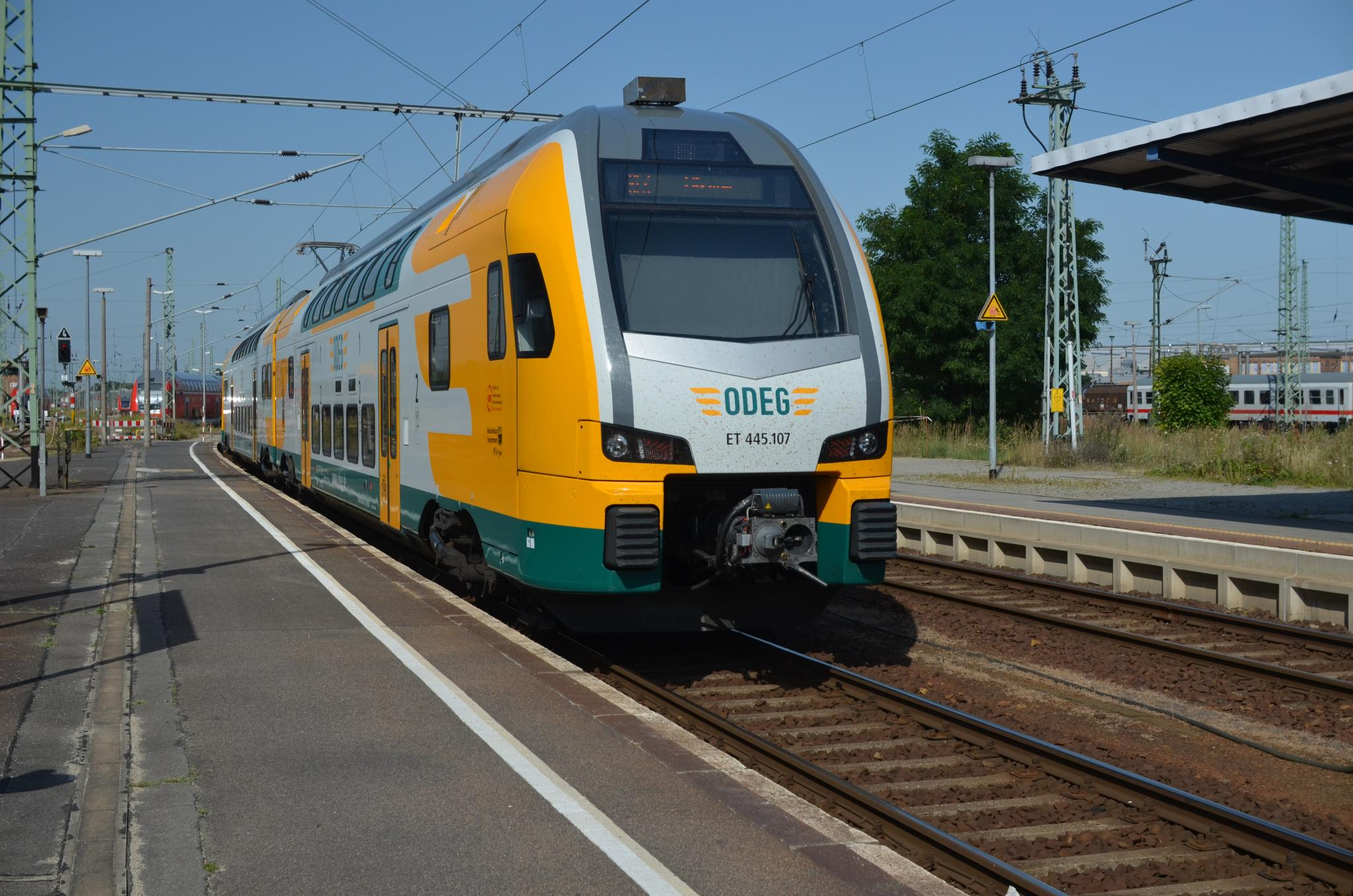
Regional Express to Berlin

From Cottbus, railway lines radiate in all directions: Regional-Express and Regionalbahn services operated by DB Regio and Ostdeutsche Eisenbahn (ODEG) run to Nauen via Berlin, as well as toward Görlitz and Zittau (Berlin–Görlitz railway), Dresden (Priestewitz–Cottbus railway), via Finsterwalde and Falkenberg (Elster) to Leipzig (Halle–Cottbus railway), to Frankfurt (Oder) (Cottbus–Guben railway), and to Forst (Lausitz) (Cottbus–Forst railway).

There is also a daily domestic long-distance connection to Emden and Norddeich Mole. Until December 2014, there were also international train connections to the Polish cities of Wrocław, Kraków, and Żagań; the Żagań service resumed in June 2023. Since 2016, the so-called "Culture Train" has run on weekends from Berlin to Wrocław. Also since June 2023, there has been a connection to Zielona Góra.

Besides the main station, Cottbus has three other DB stations: Cottbus-Sandow, Cottbus-Merzdorf, and Cottbus-Willmersdorf Nord. The Kiekebusch stop has not been served since 2006. From 1898 to 1970, a connection of the Spreewald Railway ran from Cottbus Spreewaldbahnhof via Burg to Lübben. The narrow-gauge line was almost completely dismantled by 1983. Only the station building of Spreewaldbahnhof still exists today, not far from the main station. Since 2002, an Intercity Express (ICE) train has been named Cottbus/Chóśebuz after the city.

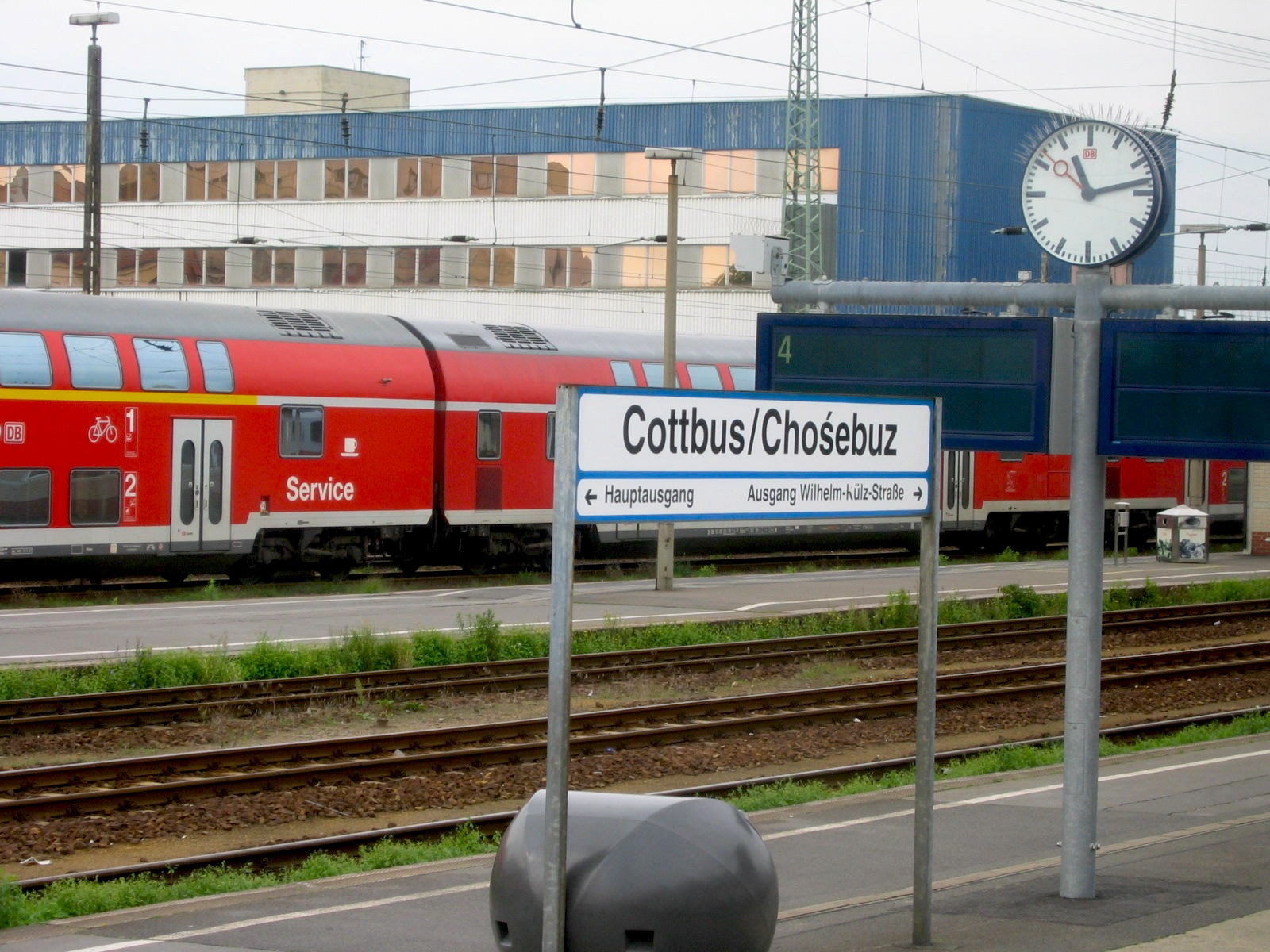
Platform with German and Lower Sorbian place names

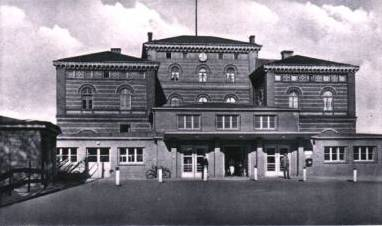
The old station building before the Second World War

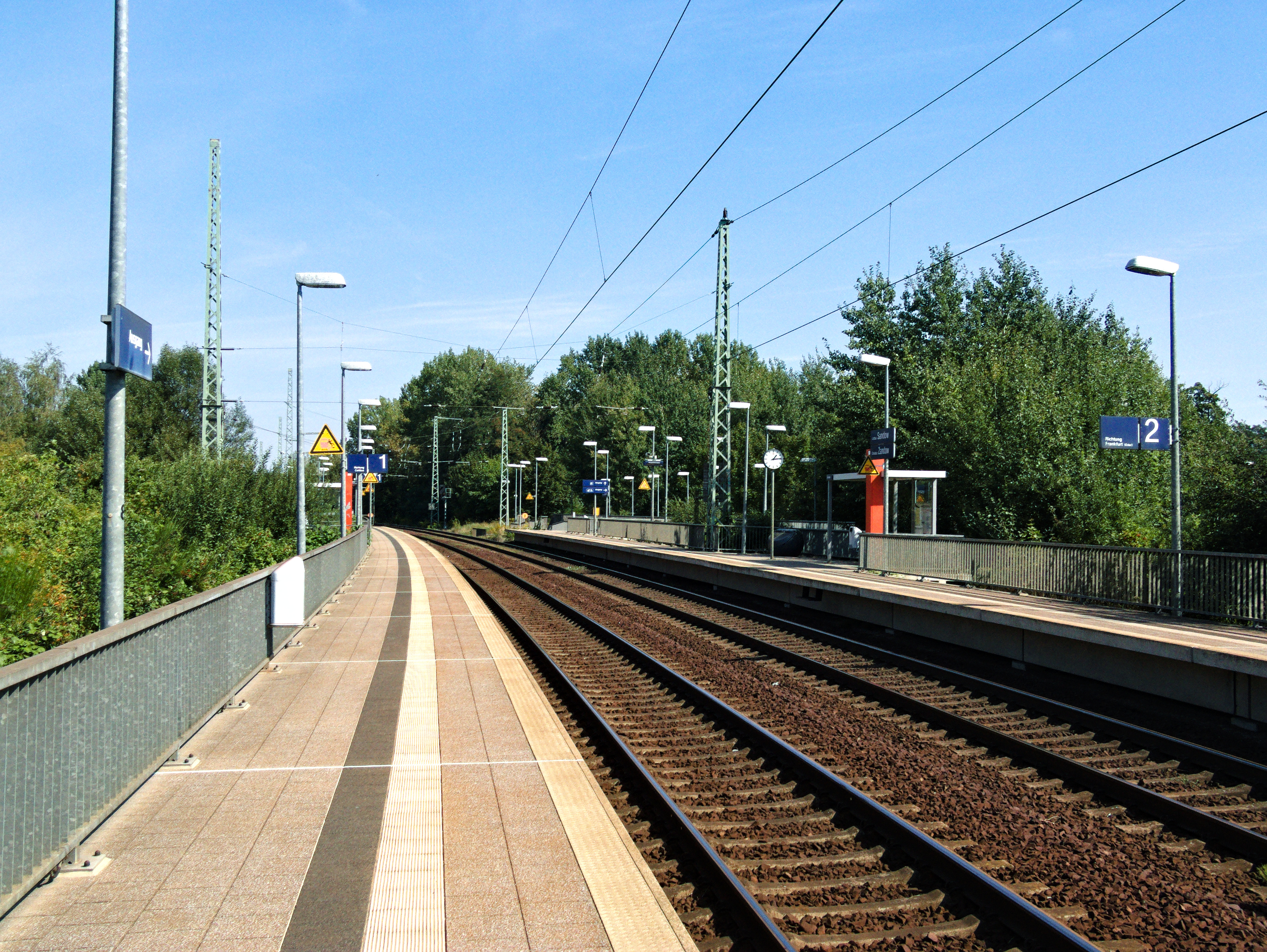
Cottbus-Sandow stop

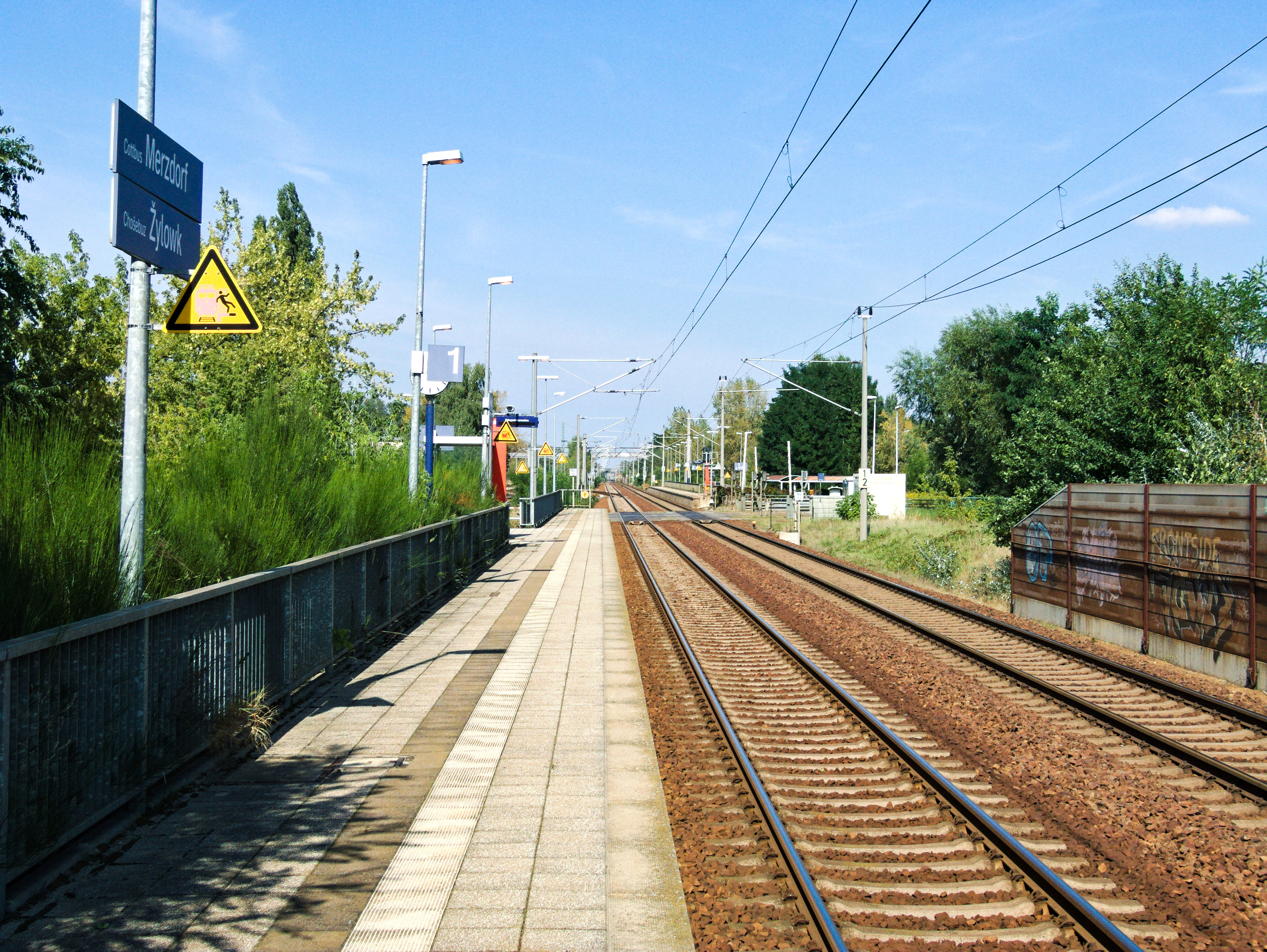
Cottbus-Merzdorf stop

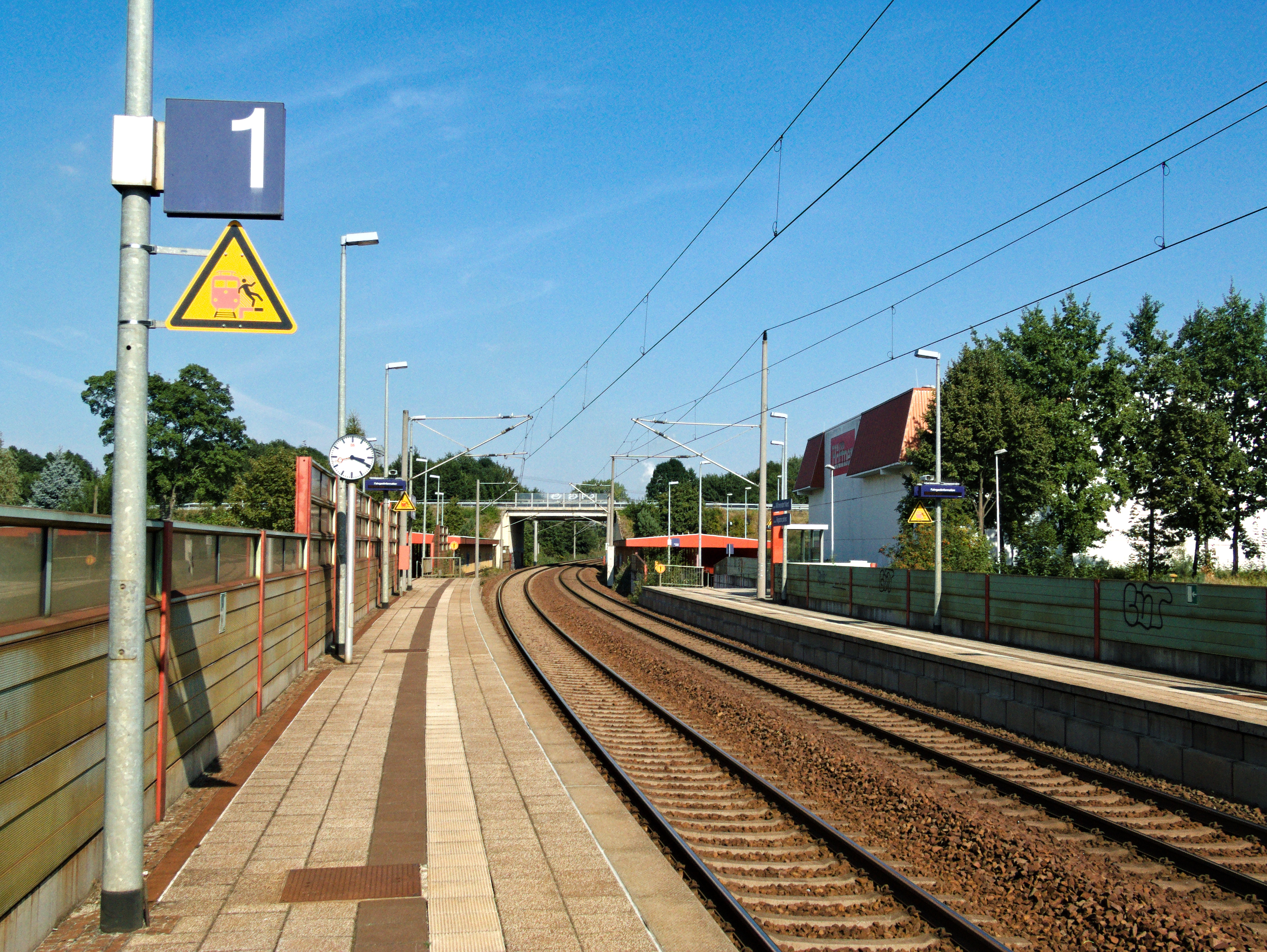
Cottbus-Willmersdorf Nord

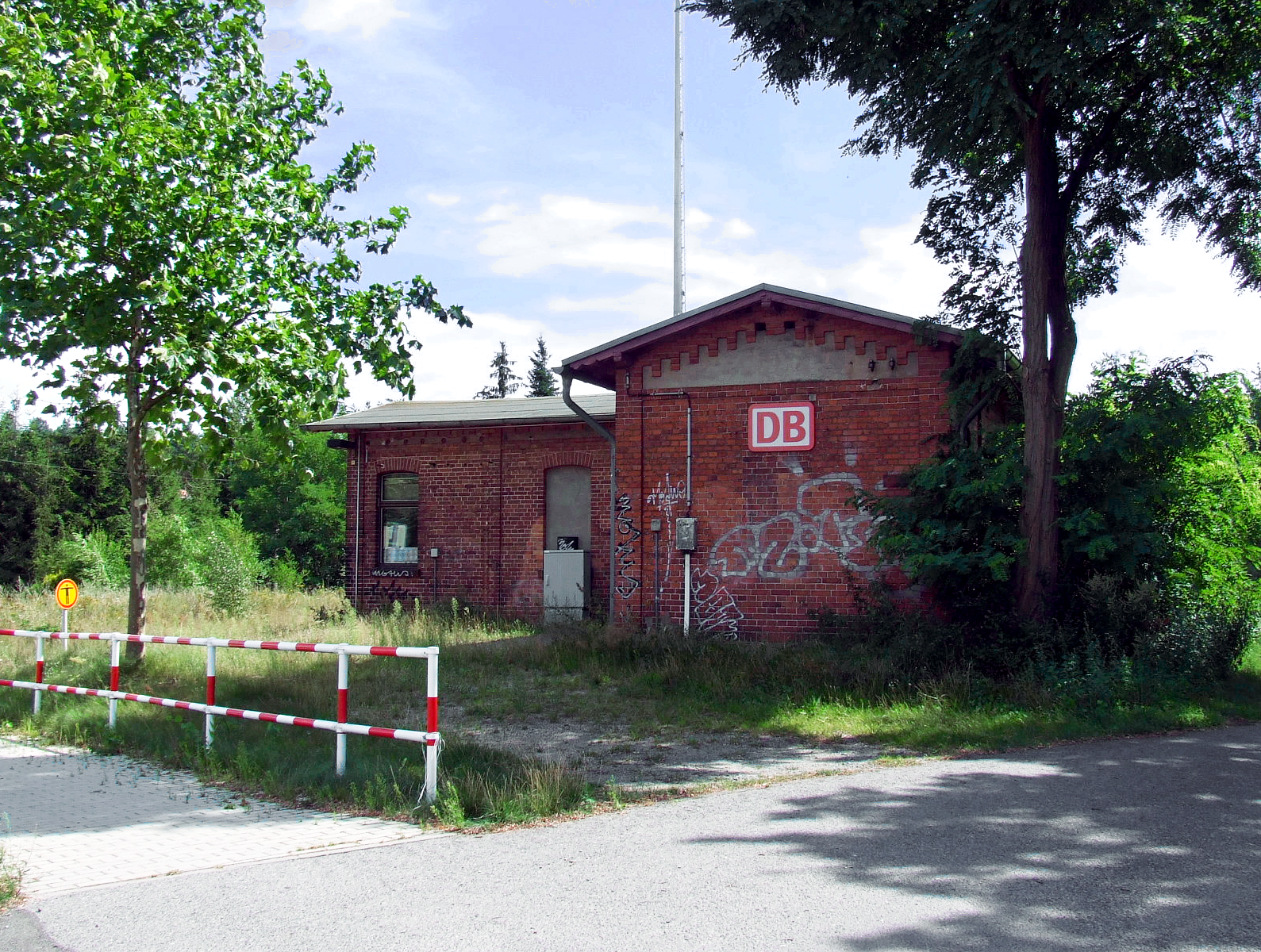
Disused Kiekebusch station

==== Public transport ====
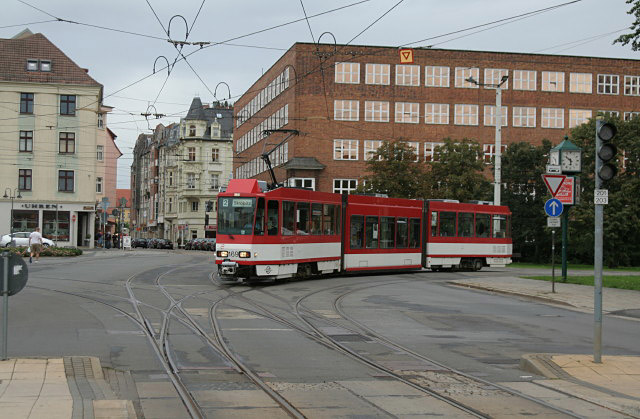
Tram in front of the town hall at the entrance to the Stadthalle stop

Schematic bilingual tram map of Cottbus as of September 2026

Local public transport (ÖPNV) is provided by trams and buses operated by Cottbusverkehr, DB Regio Bus Ost, Omnibuscenter LEO REISEN, and Verkehrsgesellschaft Oberspreewald-Lausitz, all of which are members of the Berlin-Brandenburg Transport Association (VBB). The network consists of five tram lines in Cottbus (line 5 runs only on weekends), 13 urban bus routes, 21 regional routes, and three night bus lines. The network has 637 stops and a total length of about 1,127.4 km. Cottbusverkehr operates 21 trams and 54 buses.

In addition, a park railway (600 mm gauge) connects Cottbus-Sandow station with the LEAG Energie Stadium, the trade fair center, Cottbus Zoo, and Branitz Park. It operates only in the summer months.

==== Air transport ====
Cottbus has two regional airfields. Neuhausen Airfield, about 15 km away, is one of the five largest airfields in Brandenburg with 16,000 to 20,000 flight movements per year. It offers charter flights throughout Europe, training flights, sightseeing flights, and business flights by airplane and helicopter. Local clubs also offer air sports such as parachuting and gliding.

Cottbus-Drewitz Airport, about 25 km away, also offers charter flights across Europe. The former Cottbus-Nord airfield was used by the National People's Army and is now closed. In its place, a roughly two-square-kilometer technology and industrial park is under planning and development.

The nearest international airports are Berlin-Brandenburg (one-hour drive) and Dresden (one-and-a-half-hour drive).

==== Walking and cycling ====
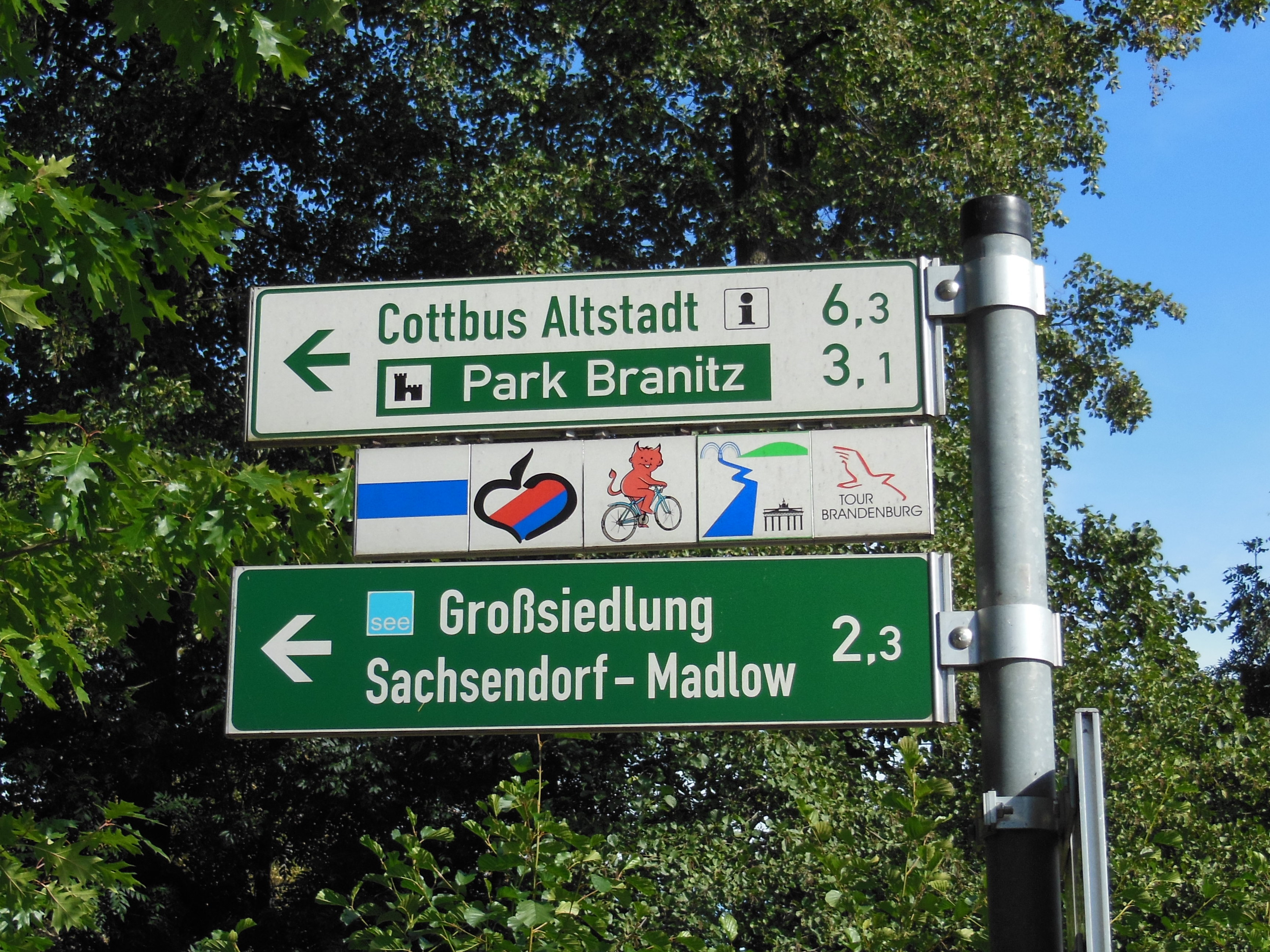
Directional road signs for cyclists

In the "Bicycle Climate Test" conducted by the German Cyclists' Federation (ADFC) in 2012, Cottbus ranked 5th out of 42 cities with 100,000 to 200,000 inhabitants (directly after the state capital Potsdam). The city is also crossed by several major long-distance cycle routes and is the starting point for cycling tours into the Spreewald or the open-pit mining region. Routes passing through Cottbus include the Fürst-Pückler-Weg, Gurken-Radweg, Lausitzer Energie-Radweg, Leichhardt Trail, Niederlausitzer Bergbautour, Sorbian Impressions in Spree-Neiße County (north and south tour), the Spree Cycle Path, and the Tour Brandenburg.

The European long-distance hiking trail E10 runs from Werben through Cottbus to Neuhausen.

== Media ==
=== Public broadcasting ===
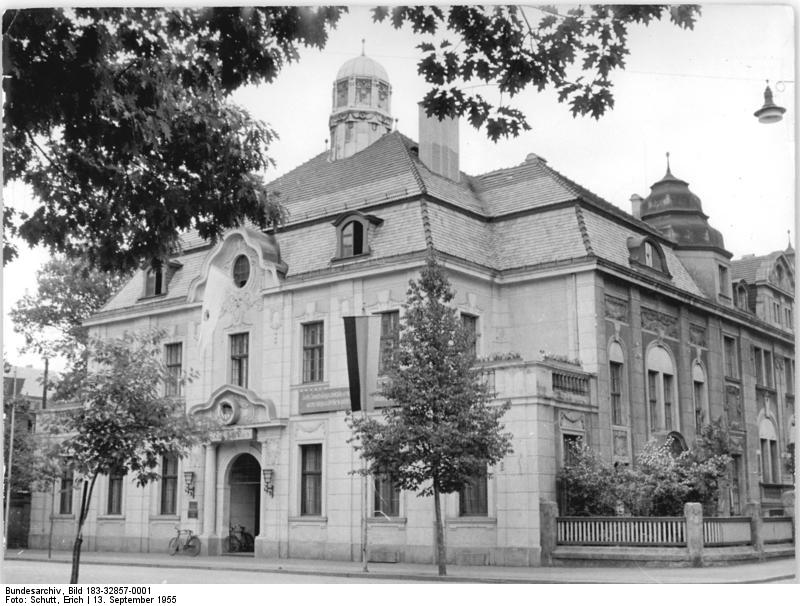
House of Friendship, Cottbus Broadcasting Studio, 1955

Cottbus is home to a regional studio of Rundfunk Berlin-Brandenburg (RBB). The Bautzen studio was taken over by Mitteldeutscher Rundfunk (MDR) on 1 January 1991.

In spring 1990, the regional studios of Radio DDR II in Cottbus, Potsdam, and Frankfurt (Oder) jointly created the radio program Antenne Brandenburg. On 1 January 1992, the program and part of the editorial teams were taken over by Ostdeutscher Rundfunk Brandenburg (ORB) and later by its legal successor, RBB. In its Cottbus radio studios, RBB produces around five hours of radio programming daily in German and, for Bramborske Serbske Radijo, in Lower Sorbian.

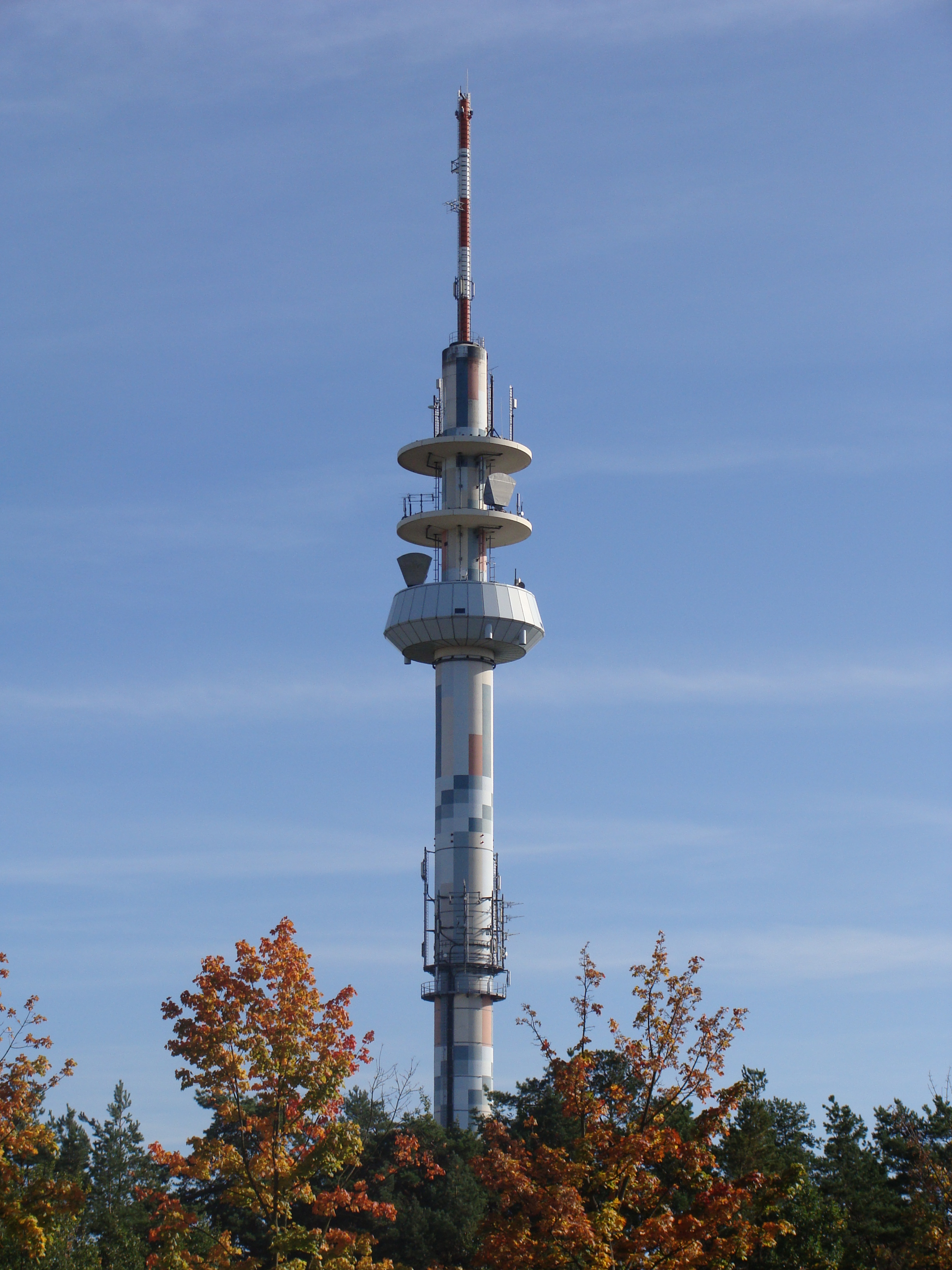
Cottbus radio tower

The RBB regional studio in Cottbus, with around 50 employees, also produces television programs and individual TV segments. Among other things, programs such as RBB regional, THEODOR – Geschichte(n) aus der Mark, and the Lower Sorbian-language program Łužyca ("Lausitz") are produced here (as of 2012). In addition, contributions are supplied for Das Erste, various "third programs" of ARD, and production assistance is provided for ZDF.

Since the closure of the old Friedrichstadtpalast in Berlin in 1980, large TV shows have been regularly produced in Cottbus. These include, for example: Ein Kessel Buntes (DFF), Die Goldene Note (DFF), Musikanten sind da (DFF), Melodien für Millionen (ZDF), Musikantenstadl (DFF/ARD/SRF/ORF), Fest der Volksmusik (ARD), and Musik für Sie (MDR). Television history was made by entertainer Harald Juhnke with his surprise appearance in the first East–West German entertainment show Musikantenstadl on 17 December 1989. Each January, RBB produces the carnival program Heut' steppt der Adler in Cottbus for ARD.

==== Private broadcasting ====
In addition to public broadcasting, private radio stations are also based in Cottbus. The station 94.5 Radio Cottbus broadcasts with a focus entirely on Cottbus and the surrounding area. BB Radio and 94,3 RS2 also air occasional regional program segments or news. Other stations such as Radio B2 and Berliner Rundfunk 91.4 can also be received via FM. Lausitz TV (LTV) is a local television channel that is freely available in the cable network.

==== Print media ====
The regional daily newspaper Lausitzer Rundschau is published in Cottbus and its surroundings, holding a monopoly position in the area. Märkischer Bote, Lausitzer Woche, and Wochenkurier are regional advertising papers. Event magazines such as Blicklicht and Hermann are also published. While the magazine Konturmagazin targets a young audience, the weekly newspaper Nowy Casnik is produced in Lower Sorbian for the Sorbian/Wendish population.

== Governance ==
=== Mayor and city council ===
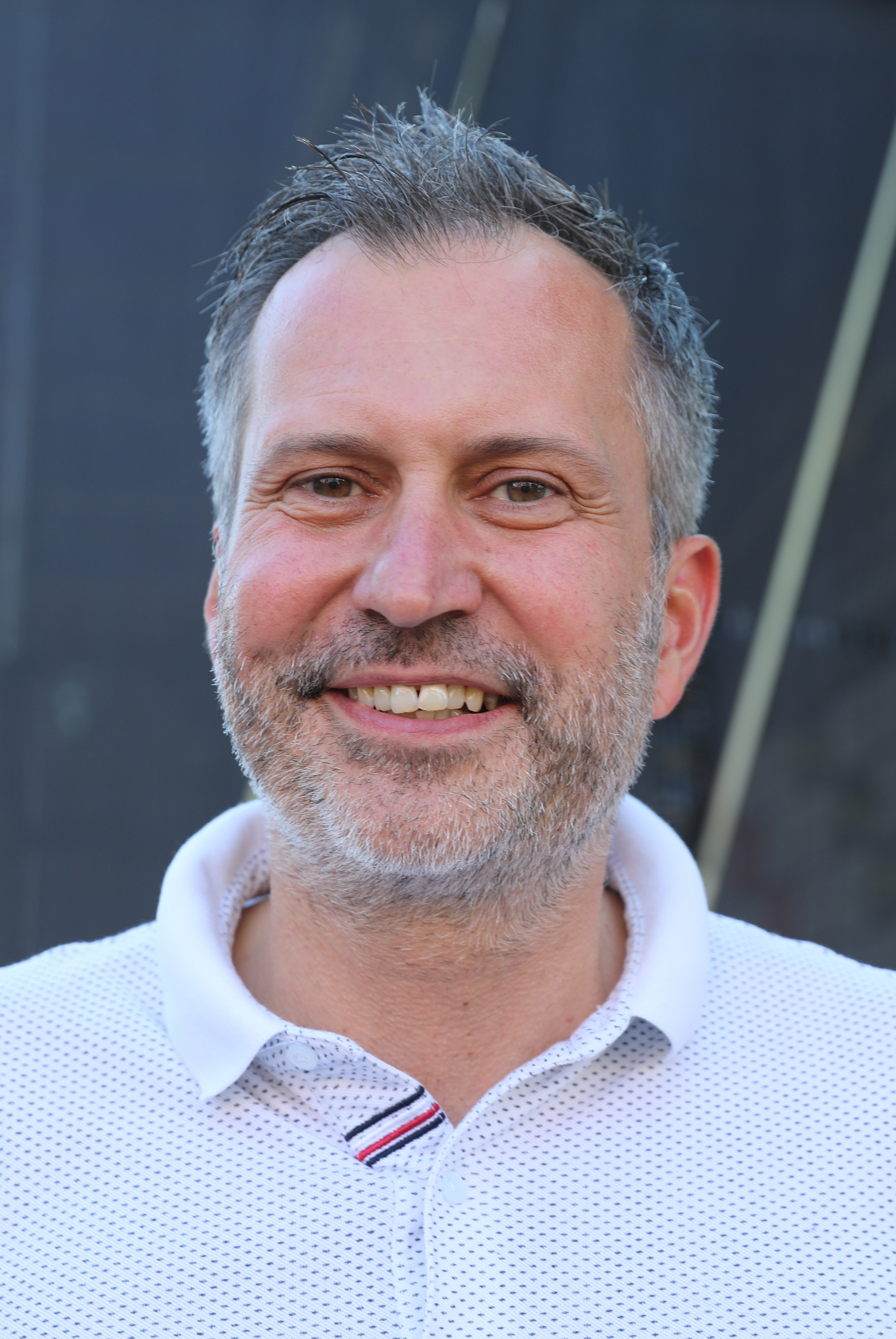
Tobias Schick in 2024

At the head of the city of Cottbus there has likely been a mayor since the 13th century, although only a few names are known. They acted as spokesmen for the residents and were subordinate to the lord of the castle. By the 16th century at the latest, there was also a council consisting of councilmen and four mayors. The number of mayors later changed. Since the 19th century, the head of the city has usually borne the title "lord mayor" (Oberbürgermeister). The council then became known as the city council (Stadtverordnetenversammlung).

Today, the lord mayor is elected directly by the citizens. He is the highest representative of the city and the head of the Cottbus city administration. The most recent mayoral election took place on 11 September 2022, with seven candidates running. Since none of the candidates achieved an absolute majority, a runoff election was held on 9 October 2022, between the two leading candidates: Tobias Schick (SPD) with 31.8 percent and Lars Schieske (AfD) with 26.4 percent. Tobias Schick won the runoff with 68.6 percent of the vote, and took office on 30 November 2022.

The current mayor is Tobias Schick of the Social Democratic Party (SPD) since 2022. The most recent mayoral election was held on 11 September 2022, with a runoff held on 9 October, and the results were as follows:

Candidate	Party	First round		Second round	
Candidate	Party	Votes	%	Votes	%
Tobias Schick	Social Democratic Party	13,300	31.8	29,526	68.6
Lars Schieske	Alternative for Germany	11,026	26.4	13,488	31.4
Thomas Bergner	Christian Democratic Union	10,302	24.6		
Sveb Benken	Our Cottbus!	2,485	5.9		
Felix Sicker	Free Democratic Party	2,377	5.7		
Lysann Kobbe	dieBasis	1,621	3.9		
Johann Staudinger	Independent	716	1.7		
Valid votes		41,827	99.4	43,014	99.1
Invalid votes		260	0.6	383	0.9
Total		42,087	100.0	43,397	100.0
Electorate/voter turnout		78,918	53.3	78,912	55.0
Source: City of Cottbus (1st round, 2nd round)

The city council governs the city alongside the mayor. The most recent city council election was held on 9 June 2024, and the results were as follows:

Party	Votes	%	+/-	Seats	+/-
Alternative for Germany (AfD)	41,731	29.2	▲6.9	14	▲3
Social Democratic Party (SPD)	27,991	19.6	▲4.0	9	▲1
Christian Democratic Union (CDU)	22,894	16.0	▼1.2	7	▼2
Our Cottbus! (UC!)	12,938	9.0	▼0.4	4	▼1
The Left (Die Linke)	10,173	7.1	▼6.6	3	▼4
Alliance 90/The Greens (Grüne)	7,066	4.9	▼4.2	2	▼2
Active Citizens–Free Voters (AUB–FW)	6,195	4.3	▼1.6	2	▼1
Middle Class Initiative Brandenburg (MIBrb)	5,881	4.1	New	2	New
Free Democratic Party (FDP)	2,926	2.0	▼2.0	1	▼1
Social Upheavel (SUB)	2,704	1.9	0.0	1	0
Secure Future Cottbus (ZSC)	2,456	1.7	New	1	New
Valid votes	142,965	100.0		46	±0
Invalid ballots	769	1.6			
Total ballots	48,820	98.4			
Electorate/voter turnout	78,002	62.6	▲6.3		
Source: City of Cottbus

== Twin towns – sister cities ==
Cottbus is twinned with:

- Montreuil, France (1959)
- Grosseto, Italy (1967)
- Lipetsk, Russia (1974)
- Zielona Góra, Poland (1975)
- Targovishte, Bulgaria (1975)
- Košice, Slovakia (1978)
- Saarbrücken, Germany (1987)
- Gelsenkirchen, Germany (1995)
- Nuneaton and Bedworth, England, United Kingdom (1999)

An intensive partnership is maintained with Zielona Góra, as annual agreements on cooperation exist with the Polish city, and this partnership is promoted at the local tourist information office. Streets in Cottbus are named after the partner cities Zielona Góra, Saarbrücken, Gelsenkirchen, and Lipetsk.

== Notable people ==
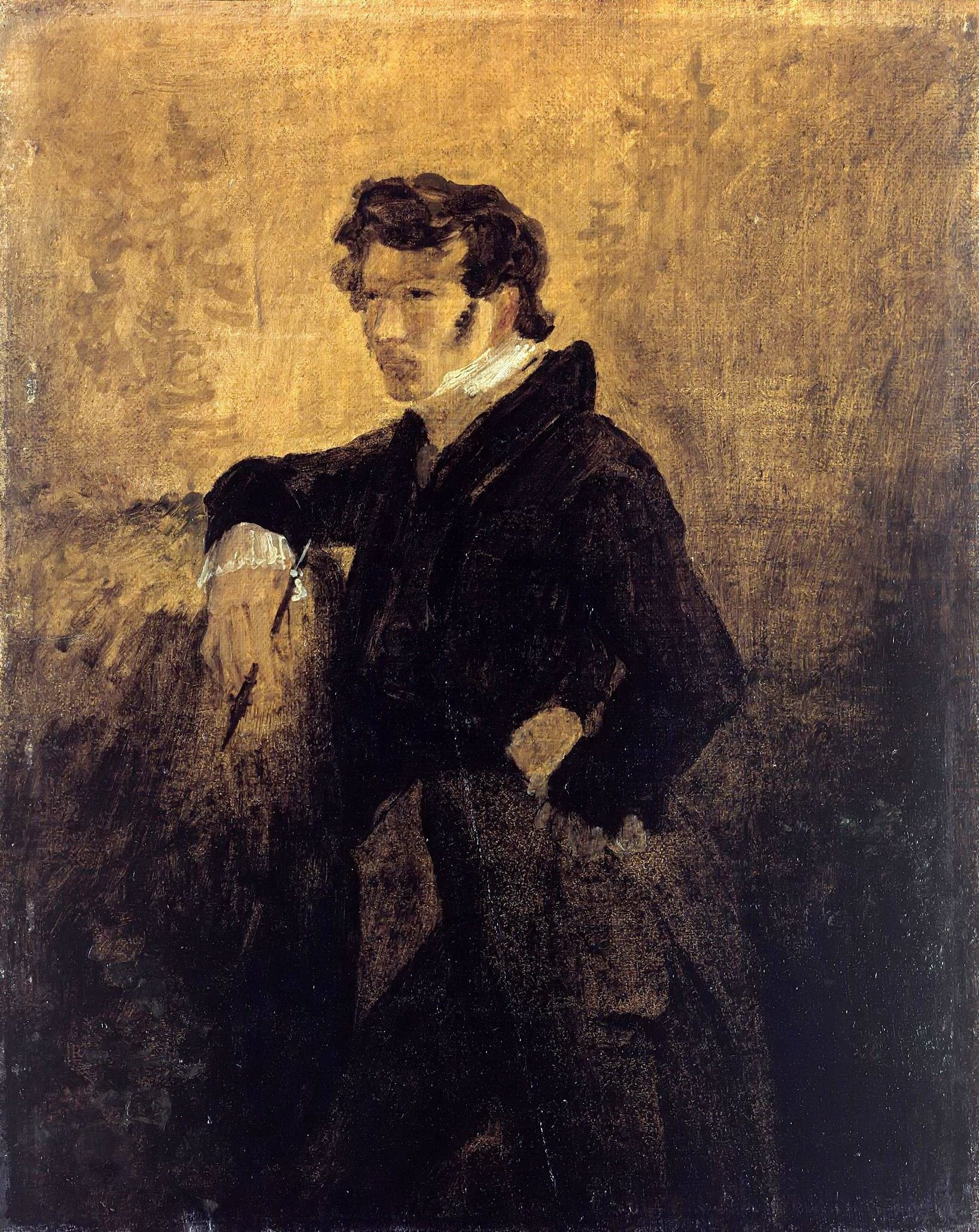
Carl Blechen – self-portrait

- Janice Behrendt (born 1983), beauty queen and model
- Carl Blechen (1798–1840), landscape painter
- Kurt Demmler (1943–2009), songwriter; accused of sexual abuse, he hanged himself in his jail cell.
- Rudi Fink (born 1958), amateur boxer and boxing coach
- Gustav Theodor Fritsch (1838–1927), anatomist, anthropologist and physiologist
- Marco Geisler (born 1974), rower
- Otto Hugo Paul Grottkau (1846–1898), socialist and trade unionist and American journalist
- Robert Harting (born 1984), discus thrower
- Martha Israel (1905–c. 1967), politician
- Max Kanter (born 1997), cyclist
- Tony Martin (born 1985), cyclist
- Jens Melzig (born 1965), footballer
- Daniel Musiol (born 1983), cyclist
- Reinhold Platz (1886–1966), aircraft designer and manufacturer at Fokker
- Colin Raak (born 2000), footballer
- Gabriele Reinsch (born 1963), world record holder discus throwing
- Viktoria Schmidt-Linsenhoff (1944–2013), art historian and professor
- Heiko Schwarz (born 1989), footballer
- Maja Wallstein (born 1986), politician

== See also ==
- Cottbus Air Base
