= Erich Schutt =

German photographer (1931–2023)

- Born: 21 June 1931; Vetschau, Saxony, Germany
- Died: 19 November 2023 (aged 92); Cottbus, Brandenburg, Germany
- Education: School of Journalism of the Association of GDR Journalists, Karl Marx University of Leipzig
- Occupations: Photographer; Photo-journalist

Erich Schutt (21 June 1931 – 19 November 2023) was a German photographer and photo-journalist. He was at his most prolific in the German Democratic Republic (East Germany: 1949–1989) during the 1950s, 1960s, 1970s, and 1980s. Since German reunification in 1990, his work has continued to draw interest and to feature in exhibition displays, as many of the subjects that he photographed, from the lignite-fuelled power station Vetschauvast on the edge of his home town to the traditional Sorbian artefacts and costumery that were still relatively mainstream during the middle decades of the twentieth century, retreat rapidly beyond living memory.

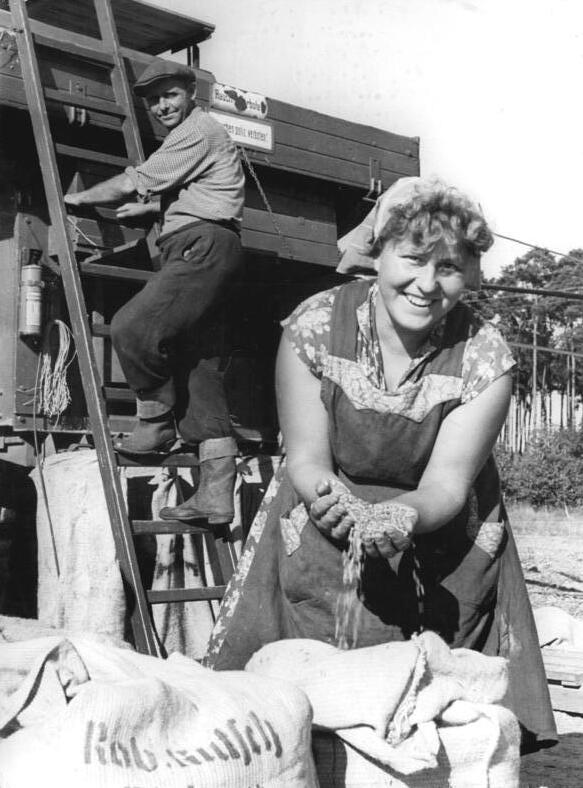
"Getreidesoll erfüllt" ("Grain target met"), Erich Schutt, 1958

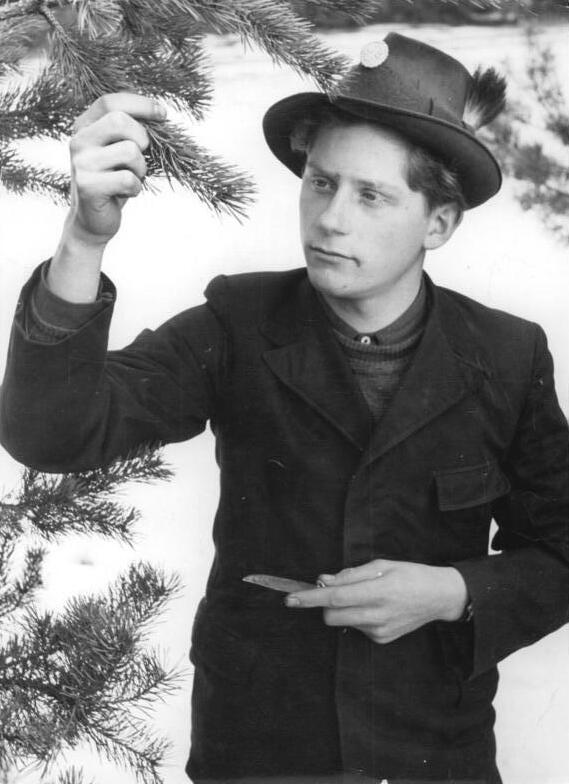
"Begutachtung von Bäumen" ("[a forestry worker] checking out a tree"), Erich Schutt, 1955

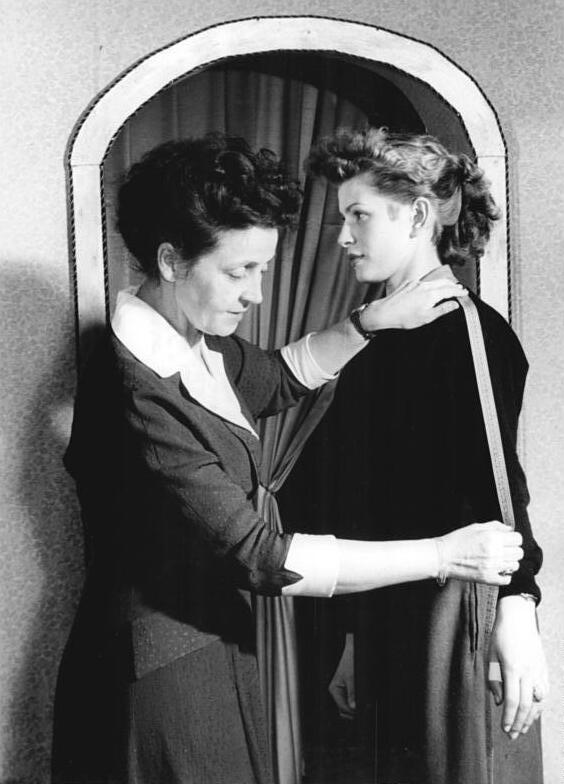
"Zuschneidewerkstatt in Cottbus" ("Dress-making workshop in Cottbus") - " .... Colleague Miss Pustal takes the measurements of a customer", Erich Schutt, 1956

== Life and works ==
Erich Schutt was born at Vetschau in the flatlands west of Cottbus about eighteen months before the Hitler government took power. Fifty years earlier the region had been overwhelmingly Sorbian speaking, but in the German countryside, as in the remoter corners of France, Belgium, and Britain, the centralising nationalism of the age meant that use of regional languages was powerfully discouraged. Nevertheless, Schutt's mother Anna, who kept the house and looked after the little animals accommodated in the garden in case of special meals, is described as "Sorbian". His father, Alfred Schutt, worked at Vetschau station, where he was responsible for looking after the points on the track. As a school boy Schutt was already taking photographs round the town with the camera "Agfa Box" he had received as a particularly lavish birthday present, until he handed it in to the Russian commander after the entire region fell under Soviet Military Administration in 1945. (Private ownership of cameras was forbidden in the Soviet occupation zone at this time.)

In 1947, Schutt embarked on an apprenticeship in pharmacy, working in the photography department of a Vetschau business called "Spreewald-Drogerie Petzold". Tasks in which he gained proficiency included selling film and the uses of a darkroom. After three years he moved on to the "Foto-Brausewetter" specialist photography business in Cottbus. The heart of the business was a large photo-laboratory employing ten laboratory assistants. Schutt mastered the technical skills needed to develop, copy, and enlarge photographs.

Schutt's career as a photo-journalist began in 1952 when he was approached by a local newspaper editor and accepted an invitation to become a part-time photo-reporter for the Brandenburgische Neueste Nachrichten. His first commission involved a visit to a garden festival at Forst, since 1945 a border town, some 35 km / 20 miles to the east, beyond Cottbus. The route was nevertheless relatively level, which was important for a photo-journalist whose sole means of travel was his bicycle. The recently launched Brandenburgische Neueste Nachrichten was a stand-alone and modestly equipped publication, and on getting home to Vetschau later that day Schutt went straight back to the photography department of "Spreewald-Drogerie Petzold", the specialist shop where he was employed, in order to develop his film and print off the pictures, which he was able to deliver to his editor's desk the next day. He was helped in this task by a colleague who soon became his wife. After they set up home together and Schutt became a full-time press photographer, films were developed at home and the pictures were dried off not in a photo-laboratory at the back of a shop, but in their own family kitchen. Things changed after the Lausitzer Rundschau relocated its operations to Cottbus during the second half of 1952, even if the role of a staff "photo-journalist" remained somewhat "niche" among regional newspapers in the "German Democratic Republic" for many years. The Brandenburgische Neueste Nachrichten had been launched as the local newspaper of the "National Democratic Party" (NDPD), a "bloc party" permitted to exist as a component of the tightly controlled East German "National Front" party grouping, whereas the Lausitzer Rundschau, as the local mouthpiece for the ruling Socialist Unity Party (SED) was much better resourced. During or before 1953 Schutt switched to the Lausitzer Rundschau, becoming the newspaper's first - and for some time its only - full-time press photographer. During more than four decades with the "Rundschau" Erich Schutt emerged as one of the best known press photographers in east Germany. He remained a member of the newspaper's staff till his retirement at the age of 63.

In 1966, after a three-year distance-learning course, Schutt received a degree in journalism from the School of Journalism of the Association of GDR Journalists attached to the University of Leipzig. He started drawing his pension in 1994, but for at least twenty-five years afterwards he continued to photograph. His private collection of several thousand negatives, prints, and enlargements covers at least sixty-five of his work. He often attended exhibitions to guide visitors and discuss his pictures.

Schutt's choice of subject matter, while to some extent driven by the requirements of publishers and for that reason characteristic of many of East Germany's better known photographers, is unusually wide-ranging. Unsurprisingly, there is a focus on the mining industries and related energy production which featured prominently in the daily life of Lower Lusatia| (Niederlausitz, and to some extent still do. The Spree Forest features frequently. Reflecting his own family background, there is also an emphasis on various aspects of Sorbian and Wendish culture. Commentators note that during his career Schutt consciously tried to avoid photographing carefully staged "press photograph" scenes. Schutt's extensive photograph archive remains privately owned, but many of his pictures have also found their way into the German Federal Archives. Due to the approach taken by the management of the German Archives, those of Schutt's images included in the Federal Archives are far more likely to be accessible online than his other works, with the result that when it comes to subject matter the Schutt images accessed most easily online are not necessarily representative of Schutt's overall output. However, between 2016 and 2018 Schutt collaborated with the Deutsche Presse-Agentur to have approximately 1,500 images from his life's work digitally recorded and catalogued.

Alongside published volumes of his pictures, Schutt's work continues to feature in public exhibitions. In 2012 more than eighty of his photographs were included in an exhibition at the Wendish Museum in Cottbus. Although his work occasionally also appears at international exhibitions, the entire body of what can readily be lumped together and categorised dismissively as the party sponsored photo-journalism of East Germany still attracts relatively little interest or recognition among commentators outside Germany.

Schutt died on 19 November 2023, aged 92.

== Memberships ==
Schutt was a member of various organisations and associations, including the short-lived East German "SIGNUM" group of leading East German photojournalists, the Photography Commission of the Cultural Association of the GDR, and the Photojournalism Commission for the National Executive of the GDR Union of Journalists.

== Published output (selection) ==
- Thomas Kläber, Norbert Krauzig und Erich Schutt: Cottbus – Schöne Seiten einer Stadt. ALfa-Verlag, Cottbus 2002, ISBN 3-935513-05-4
- Erich Schutt: Cottbus 1950 – 1995. Steffen-Verlag, Cottbus 2011, ISBN 978-3-940101-94-5
- Erich Schutt: Fotografien der Niederlausitz 1948–1991. Domowina-Verlag, Bautzen 2012, ISBN 978-3-7420-2214-1
