= Steinway Street =

Street in Queens, New York

Steinway St
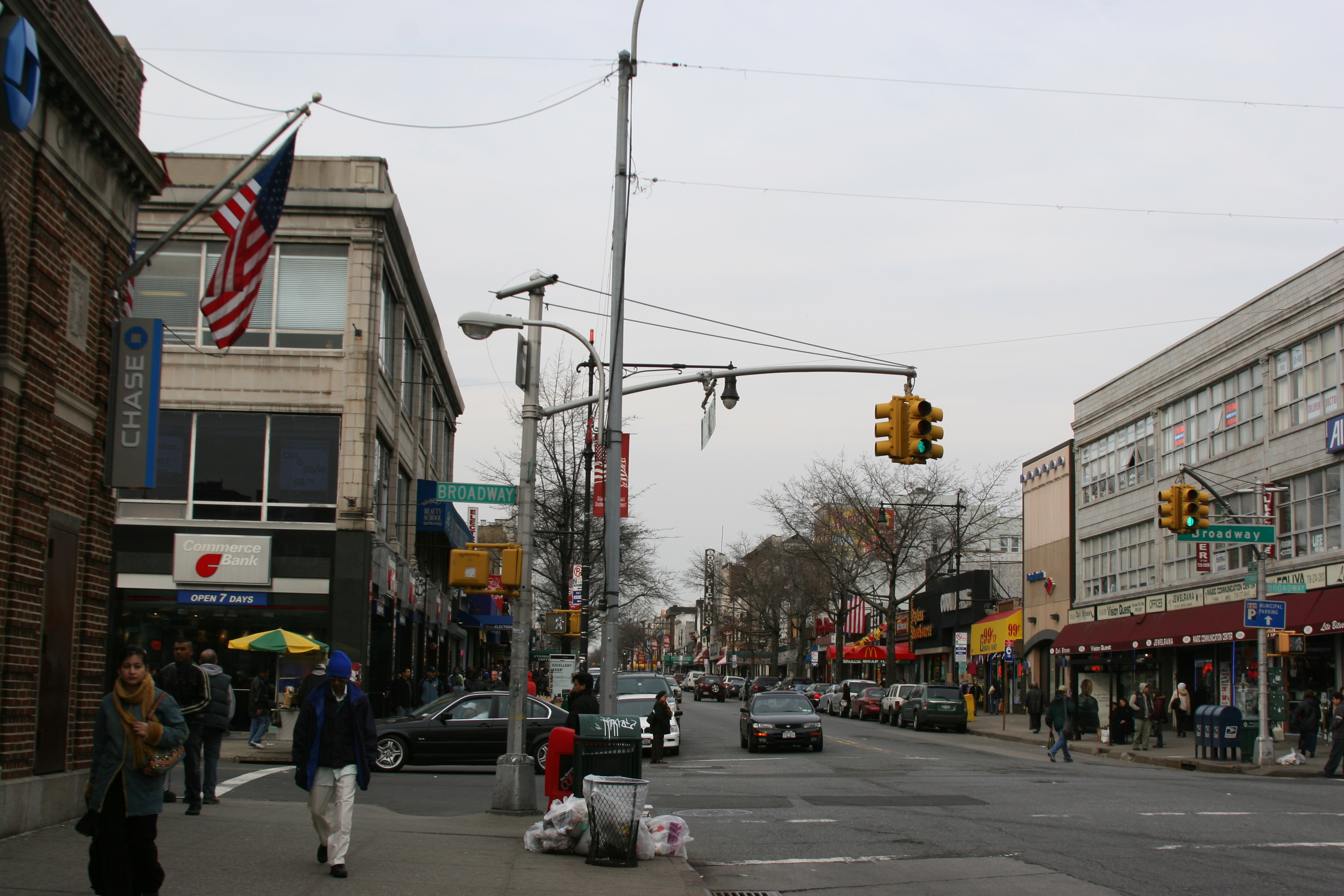
- Broadway and Steinway Street in Astoria
- Owner: City of New York
- Maintained by: NYCDOT
- Length: 2.4 mi (3.9 km)
- Location: Queens, New York City
- Coordinates: 40°46′0.18″N 73°54′45.68″W
- South end: NY 25A in Astoria
- North end: Berrian Boulevard in Ditmars

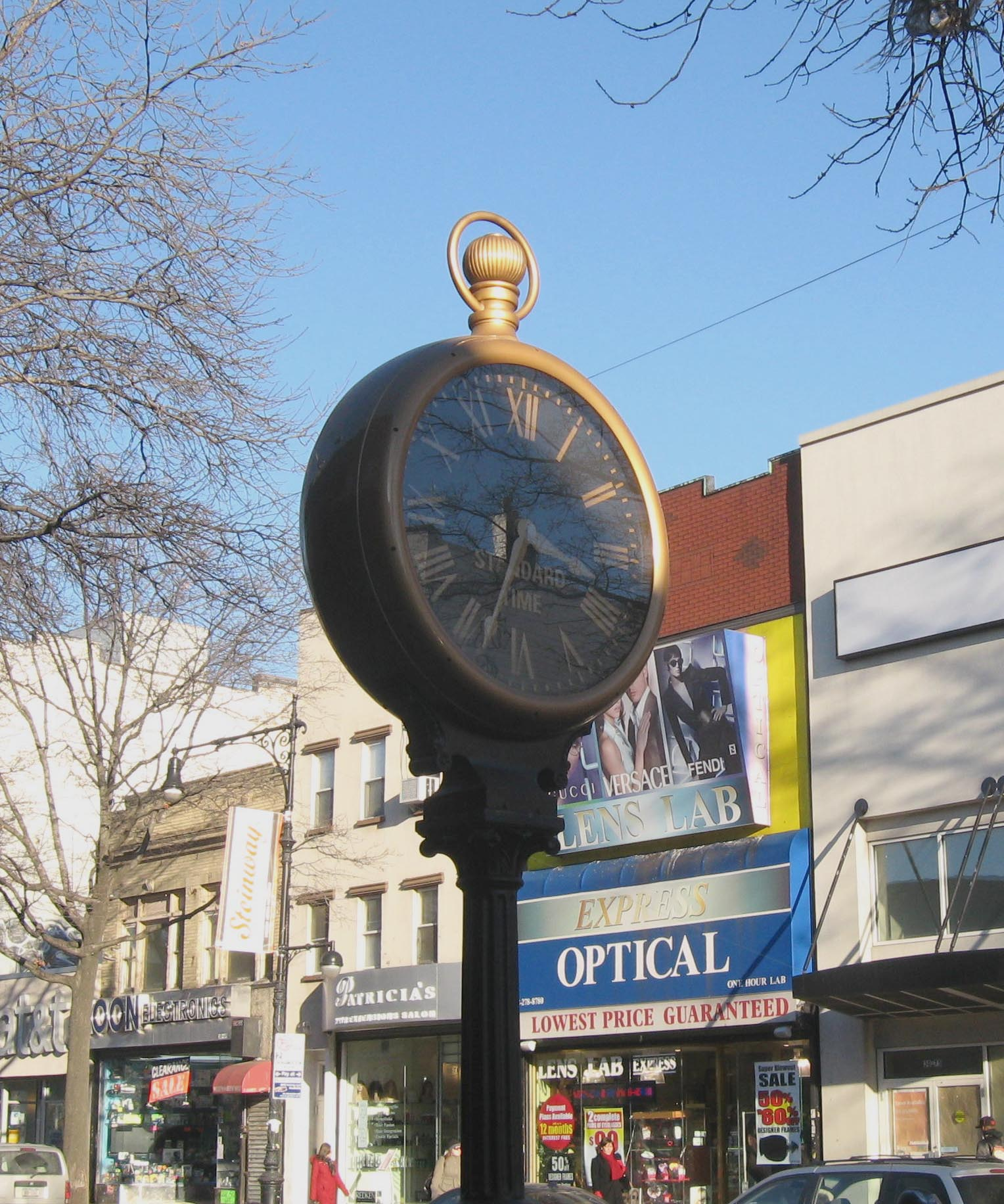
Looking northeast at 30–78 Steinway Street clock

Steinway Street is a major, 2.4-mile (3.9 km), two-way street in the borough of Queens in New York City, New York, in the United States.

== Overview ==
Steinway Street runs north–south between Berrian Boulevard in Astoria and Northern Boulevard in Long Island City. South of the Grand Central Parkway, the street is a major commercial district that is the primary section of a business improvement district called Steinway Astoria Partnership.

Richard Hellmann, creator of Hellmann's mayonnaise, had his first big factory at 495 / 497 Steinway Street from 1915 to 1922. In 1922, operations moved to a larger factory at 34-08 Northern Boulevard.

== Transportation ==
The New York City Subway's Steinway Street station, served by the M and R trains, is located under the street. The Q101 bus travels along Steinway Street south of 20th Avenue.

== See also ==
- Steinway & Sons
- Steinway Tunnel
