= Richard Hellmann =

German entrepreneur

Richard Hellmann (born June 22, 1876, in Schönebegk, Prussia, now Vetschau, Germany; died February 3, 1971, in New York City) was a German businessman who founded Hellmann's.

== Life ==
In 1903, Richard Reinhold Hellman emigrated from Vetschau, Germany, to New York City, US where in August 1904 he married Margaret Vossberg (Margarethe Vohsberg), whose parents owned a delicatessen. In mid-1905 he opened his own delicatessen at 490 Columbus Avenue, where he developed his first ready-made mayonnaise, dished-out in small amounts, as fresh and unpreserved, to customers. It became so popular that he began selling it in bulk to other stores, constantly improving the recipe to make it avoid spoilage longer.

In 1913 after continuing sales success he built a factory to produce his mayonnaise in even greater quantities, and began selling it on September 1 under the name Hellmann's Blue Ribbon Mayonnaise, seeing sales greatly increase after switching from hotel-size large stone jars to customer-size clear glass jars that could be reused for home canning after selling them a rubber ring for one cent.

In May 1914 he simplified the label from three ribbons to a single blue ribbon, and trademarked it along with the name "Blue Ribbon Mayonnaise". In 1915 he sold his store and opened a small mayonnaise factory at 120 Lawrence Street (now West 126th) in Manhattan; by the end of the year he had a larger factory at 495/497 Steinway Street in Long Island City. In February 1916 the company was incorporated as Richard Hellman, Inc., after which he briefly tried other products, such as horseradish and pumpernickel bread before deciding to concentrate on mayonnaise and expand distribution outside the New York area. In November 1919, he licensed John Behrmann to make the mayonnaise in Chicago.

In 1920, the New York Tribune asked three chefs to rate commercial salad dressing brand, and they voted Hellmann's mayonnaise the best, noting that it had more oil (85%) than any other salad dressing they tested. This helped to boost sales.

On July 29, 1920, Hellmann became a U.S. citizen; later that year, Margaret Hellmann died, and on May 11, 1922, he married second wife Nina Maxwell, daughter of Mr. and Mrs. William J. Maxwell. Hellmann merged his company with Best Foods in 1927 and retired from active management although he continued to serve as a board member of the merged company. He was also president of Richell, Inc., in Scarsdale, and a director of Fulton Savings Bank in Brooklyn. He was survived by his widow, four children and many grandchildren and great-grandchildren.
