= Wendish-German double church =

Coordinates: 51°47′02″N 14°04′21″E

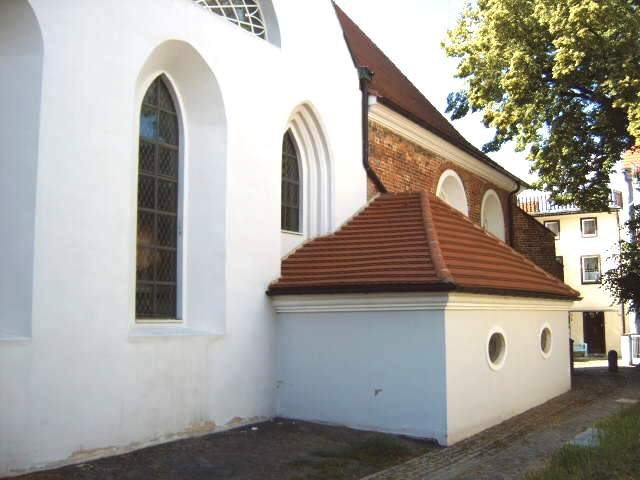
Vestry of both naves, on the left the Wendish church, on the right the German church

The Wendish-German double church (Lower Sorbian Serbsko-nimska dwójna cerkwja we Wětošowje) is a so-called double church in Vetschau (Wětošow)/Spreewald, Germany. The Protestant church consists of two naves standing side by side, with a common tower and vestry.

== History ==
=== Original construction ===
The first church construction was probably carried out at the end of the 13th Century during the Christianisation of the Wends living there. This Wendish church was built using stones found in fields and bog iron. In the course of the Reformation, the church became Protestant in 1540, following the choice of the lords von Schlieben. When fire broke out in the city in 1619, the church was burnt down. Further damage was incurred in a fire in 1642. Only the base of the tower was preserved. This original construction still forms the lower part of the steeple.

=== The construction of the Wendish church ===
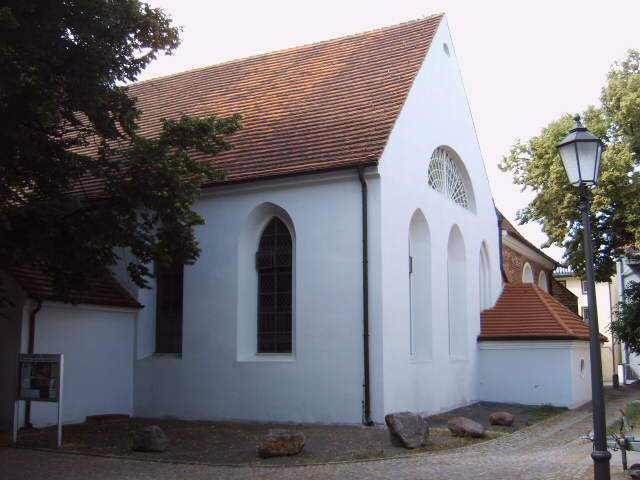
The Wendish church

A new church made of bricks was erected on the old foundations, most likely after the end of the Thirty Years' War. It had a flat roof, visible crossbeams and tall lancet windows. The western tower was at first not reconstructed. A chapel was added on the northern side, which was used by the local German lords during religious services. For them and for the few other resident Germans, services were held in German as required.

The construction that was later to be known as the Wendish church is designated in a registry entry from 1673/1674 as the principal church. It was used primarily for church services held in Wendish for the inhabitants of the 10 neighbouring Wendish hamlets, although services were also held in German. There were however efforts on the part of the Germans to have the German chapel recognised as the principal church.

=== The construction of the German church ===
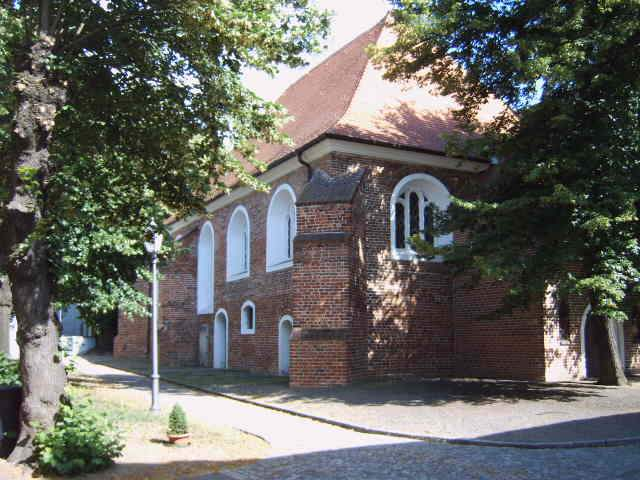
The German church

Over time, the percentage of Germans in the town of Vetschau increased, while the surrounding countryside remained largely dominated by the Wends. The German townsfolk sought to distinguish themselves from the rural Wendish population, including in their religion. Attendance grew at the church services held in German, so that the chapel, which probably had no pulpit and had been provisionally repaired following a fire, was not able to meet the needs of the Germans any more. The order was given to tear down the chapel and to replace it with a proper church for the growing German-speaking congregation. The local priests were apparently opposed to this new construction.

The chapel was torn down in 1689 and the foundations were laid for the German church on 31 May 1690. It was completed three years later in 1693. Its late Baroque nave was made of bricks and was rectangular in shape. It had arched windows that were divided into two or three sections. The ceiling took the form of a barrel vault. There were galleries with lodges for the lords along the southern and western walls, as well as along part of the northern wall. On 30 January 1694, the General Superintendent Römer from Lübben consecrated the new construction. There were now two naves directly beside one another, and both a German and a Wendish congregation existed completely side by side. The Wendish church remained the principal church, the more elaborate German church fulfilled a secondary role under its archdeacon. The churches were connected by a vestry located before the eastern gable. The vestry, which was built with a double groin vault, was probably erected at the same time as the German church. Besides the vestry, the steeple of the Wendish church was also used by both churches.

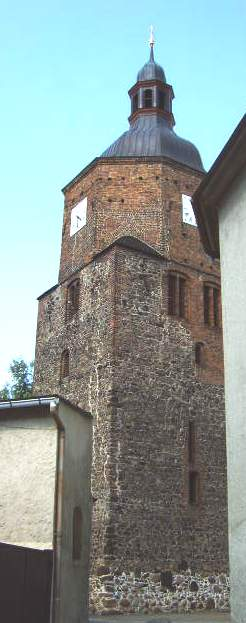
Steeple - the edge of the old tower base is recognisable at the point at which the construction continues in brick

=== Reconstruction work ===
At first, the steeple was left in ruins. Its reconstruction began in 1704 and was completed in 1709. An octagonal extension in brick was erected on top of the remains of the square tower base using trusses. The tower was topped with a bell-shaped roof with a cupola and point. Before the completion of the tower, a wooden frame had been used to house the church bell. In 1715, all of the bells were repaired or recast. An upright Star of Bethlehem placed over a procumbent half moon was added to the very top of the tower to mark the defeat of the advancing Ottoman Empire.

The church was damaged by lightning in 1847 and 1849.

In the second half of the 19th century, a comprehensive reconstruction was undertaken in the Wendish church. In order to gain more space, two-storey galleries were inserted. The previously flat roof, which inhibited the galleries, was replaced with a barrel vault. Because the galleries blocked the access of light into the church, a half-rounded window was made where the altar now stands. At the same time, a new organ from the Kaltschmidt firm in Stettin was added. The old pulpit, which is supposed to have looked more like a barrel, made way for a pulpit altar which was crowned with a cross. There were originally quotes from the Bible in a predella to both sides of the pulpit, but these were painted over later.

The German church was painted at this time in the neo-gothic style, which replaced its original late Baroque colours. Towards the end of the 19th century, the western vestibule of the German church was renovated. The original roof construction was preserved but the timber framing was replaced with a brick construction. A new organ from the firm Schlag & Söhne from Schweidnitz (Schlesien) was added in 1899. New windows were put in at the same time.

=== The decline of the Wendish church ===
In 1910, both congregations were united in one parish. The German authorities were trying at the time to repress the Sorbian culture and language in favour of those of the German population. With the discontinuation of school education in Wendish at the start of the 20th century, the Wendish language lost a lot of importance and support. Attendance at the Wendish church service fell, and the last such service took place in 1932. It is speculated that an over-eager obedience to the Nazis, who took power in 1933, led to this development.

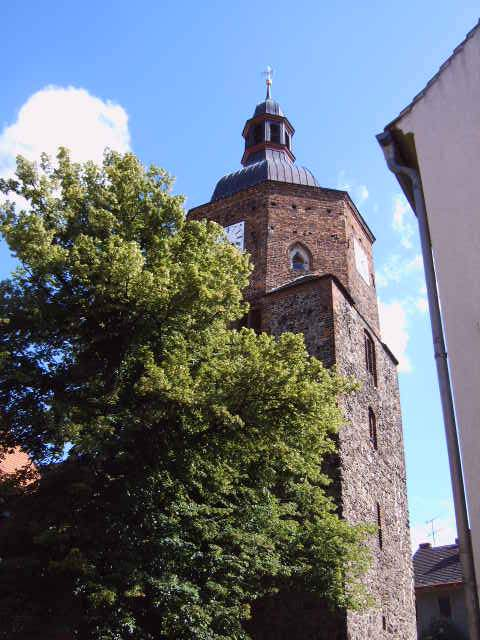
The steeple

Both church naves were nonetheless still used for regular church services until 1977. The Wendish church was designated as a country church, the German church as a town church at this time. From 1977 onwards, the Wendish church was used only as a storage space. It was used to store parts of the Pritzen town church which had had to make way for a brown coal surface mine.

In 1990, the organ in the German church was restored.

=== The Wendish church as a cultural site ===
On 10 October 1995, an organisation called Wendische Kirche e.V. was founded to promote the use of the Wendish church as a cultural site. Both churches were restored in 2000 and 2001. The German church is still used by the congregation, but the Wendish church was taken over by the town Vetschau for use as a cultural site. It regularly plays host to concerts and exhibitions. One exhibition recalls the churches that were destroyed in the region to make space for brown coal surface mines.

Every year since 1995, there has been a church service in Wendish (lower Sorbian) on the German European Heritage Day in the Wendish church.

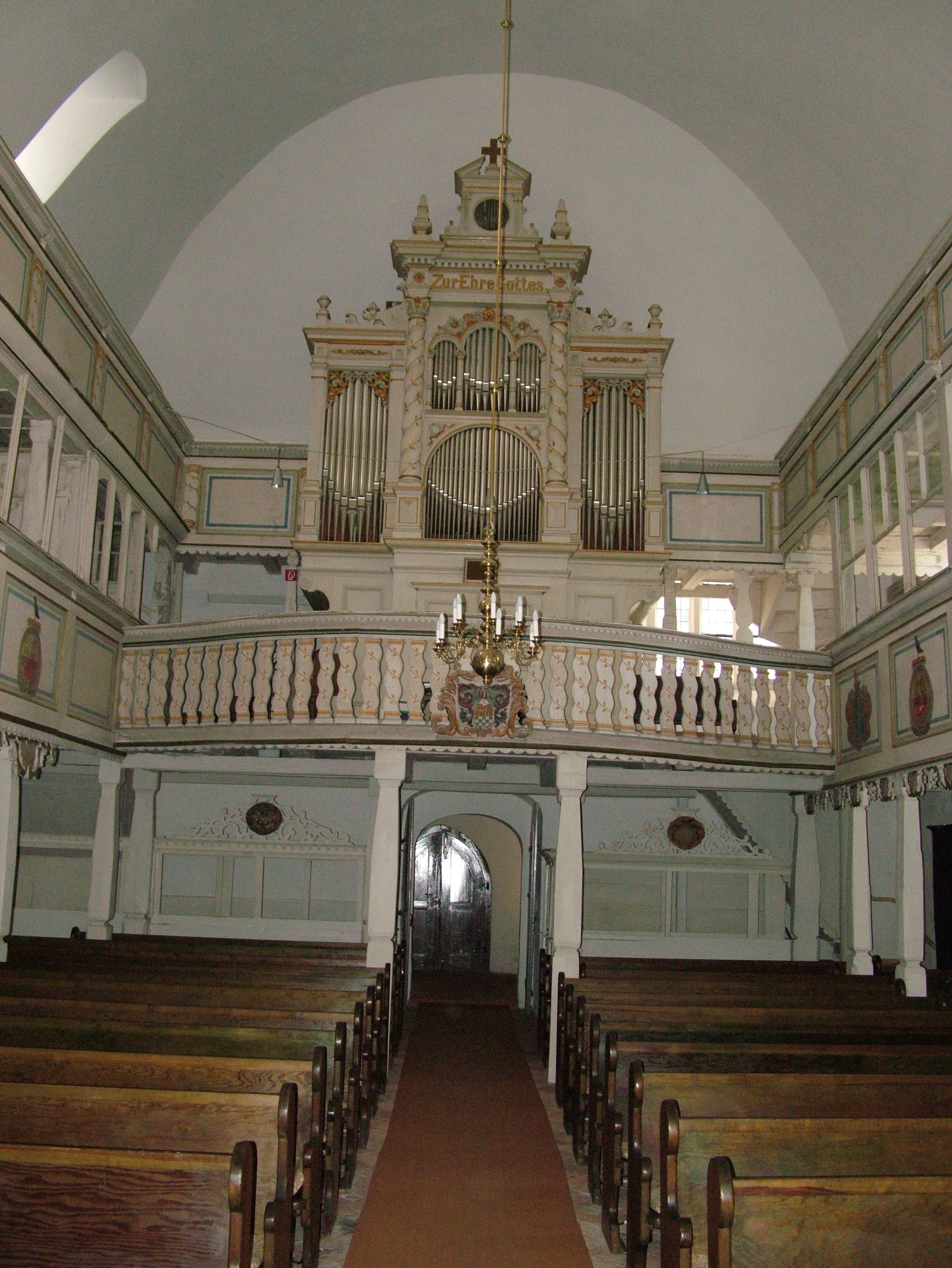
Organ gallery in the German church

== The interior ==
Besides the features of note in the Wendish church already mentioned, there are two gravestones. The first, for an E. von Schlieben who died in 1668 is in the northern half of the eastern gable and is surrounded by a frame designed to look like acanthus. The second, which is from the beginning of the 18th century, is located in the southern half of the eastern gable.

The interior of the German church dates for the most part back to the original construction. The original Baroque colour scheme has nonetheless been changed. The altar pedestal is said to be a work of Abraham Jäger from Doberlug. The decoration on the pedestal shows Jesus' empty grave following his resurrection. The wooden pulpit on the northern wall features a roof in the form of a crown which is topped by an angel with a trumpet.

To the left of the altar is a baptismal font from the 13th century, originally from the church of Schönfeld, one of many villages in the area which were destroyed to make way for brown coal surface mining. The font lid is to be found in Kittlitz. To the right of the altar is the so-called princely lodge. The name comes from the coat of arms on the lodge, which features a prince's crown.

The Organ in the German church was built in the space of five months in 1899. Its functioning and pneumatic controls are a tribute to the technical feats of the time.

The church treasury in the vestibule of the German church is marked with the date 1645 and is also of note. On the steeple, a plaque honours the memory of the lower Sorbian poet Hans Bock, who was born in Vetschau in 1569.

== The double church in literature ==
In his work Die Lebensuhr des Gottlieb Grambauer, Ehm Welk recounts a tale that he had been told by his father Gottfried and that takes place in the double church in 1866:

The Wendish priest had two beautiful white benches in front of his door on which we often sat. Sometimes also with young girls, decent ones mind you. He always chased us away. "You'd do better sitting on a bench in church," said he, "but I don't see you there!" As we had two churches side by side - the German church and the Wendish church - I asked him: "In which of the two churches should we sit?" He was quite taken aback, but then he answered: "The Lord God doesn't care!" Well, I thought, here we go, and asked: "If the Lord God doesn't care, then why do we have to have two of them?" Thereupon he swore something about "cheeky rascals" and ran after us.
