= Wendish Museum =

Museum in Cottbus, Germany

Coordinates: 51°45′36″N 14°20′04″E

- Wendisches Museum Cottbus/Serbski muzej Chóśebuz
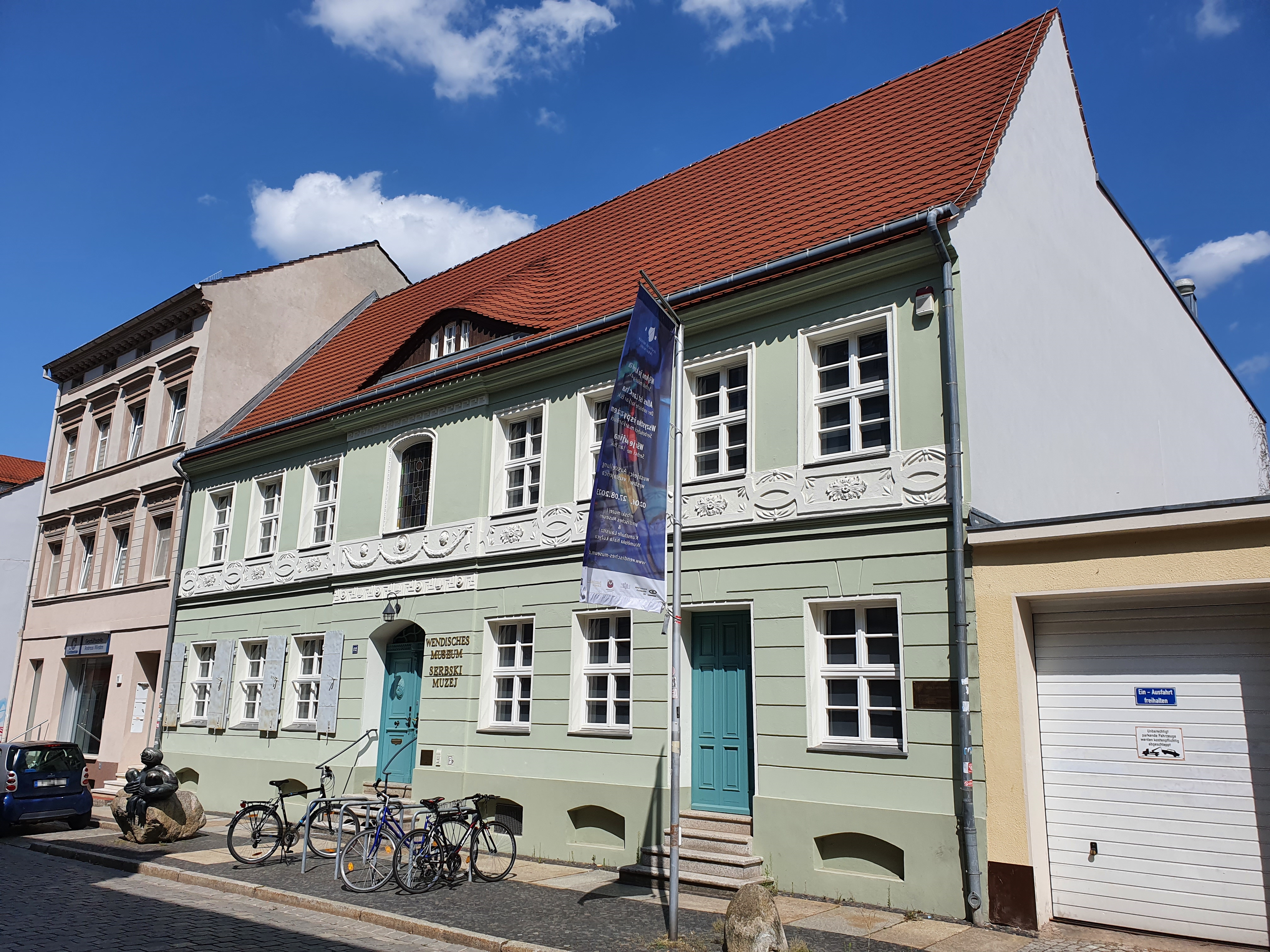
- Established: 1994
- Location: Cottbus, Germany
- Curator: Werner Meschkank
- Website: www.wendisches-museum.de

The Wendish Museum, Lower Sorbian: Serbski muzej, German: Wendisches Museum, is a museum of the culture and history of the Wends and Sorbs in Lower Lusatia. It is located in Cottbus, Brandenburg, Germany. It encompasses a large collection of Tracht, especially from the Spree Forest region. Apart from its permanent exhibition, the museum hosted more than 40 special exhibitions on various topics. All exhibitions are bilingual Lower Sorbian and German.

== History ==
The museum in its current form exists since 1994, but builds on the former Wendish Farmers Hut, that existed until the time of Nazi Germany in the Cottbus Municipal museum. The entire collection was lost during World War II.

In the Democratic Republic of Germany a Museum for Lower Sorbian literature was established in 1980, located in Schloss Barnitz. At first, it was merely a temporary exhibition that was later archived. Five years later, the collection was turned into a permanent exhibition, which also included Sorbian music, art and ethnological objects. An archiv of newspaper and book resources was planned in order to ease public access to and research on Sorbian culture.

After the German reunification, the current Wendish Museum was established in Cottbus in 1994. It was closed between 2016 and 2020 for restoration. As a substitute, an exhibition on Sorbian culture was shown in the municipal museum of Cottbus.
