= Hellmann's and Best Foods =

Food brands

Hellmann's Best Foods

- Product type: Mayonnaise, condiments, ketchup, sauce, mustard, salad dressings
- Current owner: Unilever
- Country: United States
- Introduced: 1913; 113 years ago
- Markets: Worldwide
- Previous owners: Richard Hellmann, Inc. Best Foods division of Gold Dust Corporation; CPC International; Bestfoods Corporation
- Tagline: "Bring out the best"
- Website: www.hellmanns.com www.bestfoods.com

Hellmann's and Best Foods are brand names that are used for the same line of mayonnaise, ketchup, mustard, sauces, salad dressings, condiments and other food products. They have been owned by the British multinational company Unilever since 2000.

Hellmann's and Best Foods are marketed similarly. Their logos and websites resemble each other, and they share the same slogan: "Bring out the best". The Hellmann's brand is sold in the Middle East, the United States east of the Rocky Mountains, in Latin America, Europe, Australia, Canada, India, and Pakistan. The Best Foods brand is sold in the United States west of the Rocky Mountains, in East Asia, Southeast Asia, Australia, and New Zealand.

Both brands were previously sold by the U.S.-based Bestfoods Corporation, which also sold several other food products in addition to Hellmann's and Best Foods mayonnaise. Bestfoods, known as CPC international before 1997, was acquired by Unilever in 2000. In March 2026, Unilever, the owner of the mayonnaise brands, announced it was merging its foods business with McCormick & Company as part of a portfolio restructuring, with revenues exceeding $20 billion. The transaction is expected to close by mid-2027.

== History ==
In 1903, Richard Reinhold Hellman (1876–1971) emigrated from Vetschau, Germany, to New York City, US where in August 1904 he married Margaret Vossberg, whose parents owned a delicatessen. In mid-1905, he opened his own delicatessen at 490 Columbus Avenue, where he developed his first ready-made mayonnaise, which he dished out in small portions to customers. It became so popular that he began selling it in bulk to other stores, constantly improving the recipe to make it avoid spoilage longer.

In 1913, after continued success, he built a factory to produce his mayonnaise in even greater quantities, and began selling it on September 1 under the name Hellmann's Blue Ribbon Mayonnaise, seeing sales greatly increase after switching from hotel-size large stone jars to customer-size clear glass jars that could be reused for home canning after selling them a rubber ring for 1 penny. In May 1914, he simplified the label from three ribbons to a single blue ribbon, and trademarked it along with the name "Blue Ribbon Mayonnaise". In 1915, he sold his store and opened a small mayonnaise factory at 120 Lawrence Street (now West 126th) in Manhattan; by the end of the year, he had a larger factory at 495/497 Steinway Street in Long Island City. In February 1916, the company was incorporated as Richard Hellmann, Inc., after which he briefly tried other products, such as horseradish and pumpernickel bread, before deciding to concentrate on mayonnaise and expand distribution outside the New York area. In November 1919, he licensed John Behrmann to make the mayonnaise in Chicago.

On July 29, 1920, Hellman became a U.S. citizen; later that year, Margaret Hellmann died, and on May 11, 1922, he married second wife Nina Maxwell, daughter of Mr. and Mrs. William J. Maxwell.

In 1922, after sales of the mayonnaise were launched in Toronto, Ontario, Hellmann began building a larger (5-story) factory at 34-08 Northern Boulevard in Long Island City. While honeymooning in San Francisco, California, Hellmann decided to open a plant there as well, setting up an office and recruiting salesmen. In 1922, the Hellmann's mayonnaise cookbook was published by Behrman in Chicago.

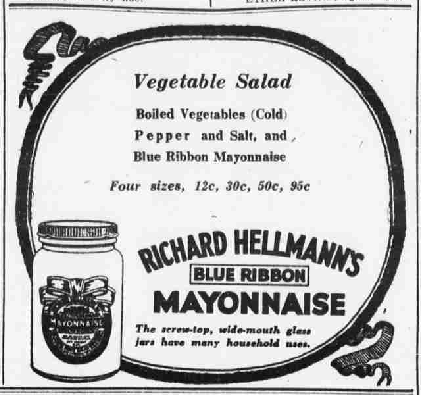
Hellmann's Blue Ribbon ad from 1922

Hellmann's Mayonnaise thrived on the U.S. East Coast, selling $15 million a year by 1927 with $1 million in profits.

In August 1927, Postum Foods bought Richard Hellmann, Inc., allowing Hellmann to retire. In 1928, "the original company (the pre-existing Best Foods, Inc.) was taken over by the Gold Dust Corporation", (owners of American Cotton Oil Co. and American Linseed Co.).

In 1931, Postum (now General Foods) merged Hellmann Inc. into "The Best Foods, Inc." along with the pre-existing Best Foods Inc. line of mayonnaise, then owned by the Gold Dust Corporation. By then, both brands of mayonnaise had such commanding market shares in their respective halves of the country that the company decided that both brands and recipes be preserved in their respective territories.

Best Foods Mayonnaise is sold west of the Rocky Mountains, specifically, in and west of Montana, Wyoming, Colorado, and New Mexico, as well as Colby and Goodland, Kansas. Hellmann's is sold east of the Rockies, specifically, in and east of the states of North Dakota, South Dakota, Nebraska, Kansas, Oklahoma, parts of Colorado and Texas.

In 1955, Best Foods acquired Rosefield Packing Co., makers of Skippy peanut butter. In 1958, Best Foods was acquired by Corn Products Refining Company to form Corn Products Company, which in 1969 became CPC International Inc. Hellmann's mayonnaise arrived in the United Kingdom in 1961 and, by the late 1980s, had over 50% market share.

Since 1960, Hellmann's and Best Foods have been advertised together, with their copy originally read out or displayed as Hellmann's in the East, Best Foods in the West. Around 1968, the Best Foods brand added the Blue Ribbon from the Hellmann's brand. Since 2007, both brands have had the same design.

Logo of Bestfoods Corporation from 1998 to 2000

In 1997, CPC International renamed itself Bestfoods, focusing on packaged food products (including the Hellmann's brand), and spun-off the corn-refining business into a new company called Corn Product International, currently known as Ingredion. Bestfoods was acquired by Unilever in 2000.

On February 1, 2023, Hellmann's was discontinued in South Africa due to high inflationary import costs.

In March 2026, Unilever, the owner of the mayonnaise brands, announced it was merging its foods business with McCormick & Company as part of a portfolio restructuring, with revenues exceeding $20 billion. The transaction is expected to close by mid-2027.

== Recipe and marketing issues ==
Hellmann's / Best Foods Real Mayonnaise
Nutritional value per 1 tbsp (13 g)
- Energy: 90 kcal (380 kJ)
- Carbohydrates: 0 g
- Fat: 10 g
- Saturated: 1.5 g
- Trans: 0 g
- Monounsaturated: 2.5 g
- Protein: 0 g
Vitamins and minerals
Minerals	Quantity %DV^{†}
Sodium	4% 90 mg
- Other constituents: Quantity
- Cholesterol: 5 mg
- Note: Both brands have the same nutritional values
- ^{†}Percentages estimated using US recommendations for adults. Source: Hellmann's

When Best Foods acquired the Hellmann's brand, it decided to keep the respective recipes for both mayonnaises. As of June 2003, the recipes have been almost identical. From the company's FAQs at the time:

The products are basically the same. Both trademarks evolved simultaneously – Hellmann's in the East and Best Foods in the West. Taste preferences vary; some people find that Best Foods mayonnaise is slightly more tangy.

The two products are made in the same plant. Both labels contain the same ingredients in the same 'relative quantity' order: soybean oil, water, whole eggs & egg yolks, vinegar, salt, sugar, lemon juice, sorbic acid, calcium disodium EDTA, and natural flavors. Best Foods' may contain more lemon juice, though the ingredients, ordered by volume, are the same as Hellmann's. The fine print in the company's marketing and websites state that "Hellmann's is known as Best Foods west of the Rockies" and "Best Foods is known as Hellmann's east of the Rockies"

The recipe may vary by country. For example, in the UK rapeseed oil is used in place of soybean oil. The ingredients list also includes paprika extract.

Maintaining brand separation in the USA poses unique challenges. Marketing campaigns for both products are identical, though outside live cross-country events such as awards shows and sports, Hellmann's and Best Foods must produce a separate ad for each brand, including the Hellmann's ad airing on a national television network's Eastern/Central feed, and the Best Foods ad as part of the Mountain/Pacific feed. The mayonnaise and Unilever have been advertised on the Super Bowl broadcast since 2022, with Hellman's appearing more prominently than Best Foods, the ads being used as a vehicle to advertise Unilever's involvement with the anti-hunger charity Feeding America. In July 2025, the Hellmann's mascot, Manny Mayo, officiated a wedding at the Viva Las Vegas chapel in Las Vegas as part of a contest.

== See also ==
- German inventors and discoverers
- List of mayonnaises
