= Vetschau =

Vetschau Wětošow
- Town
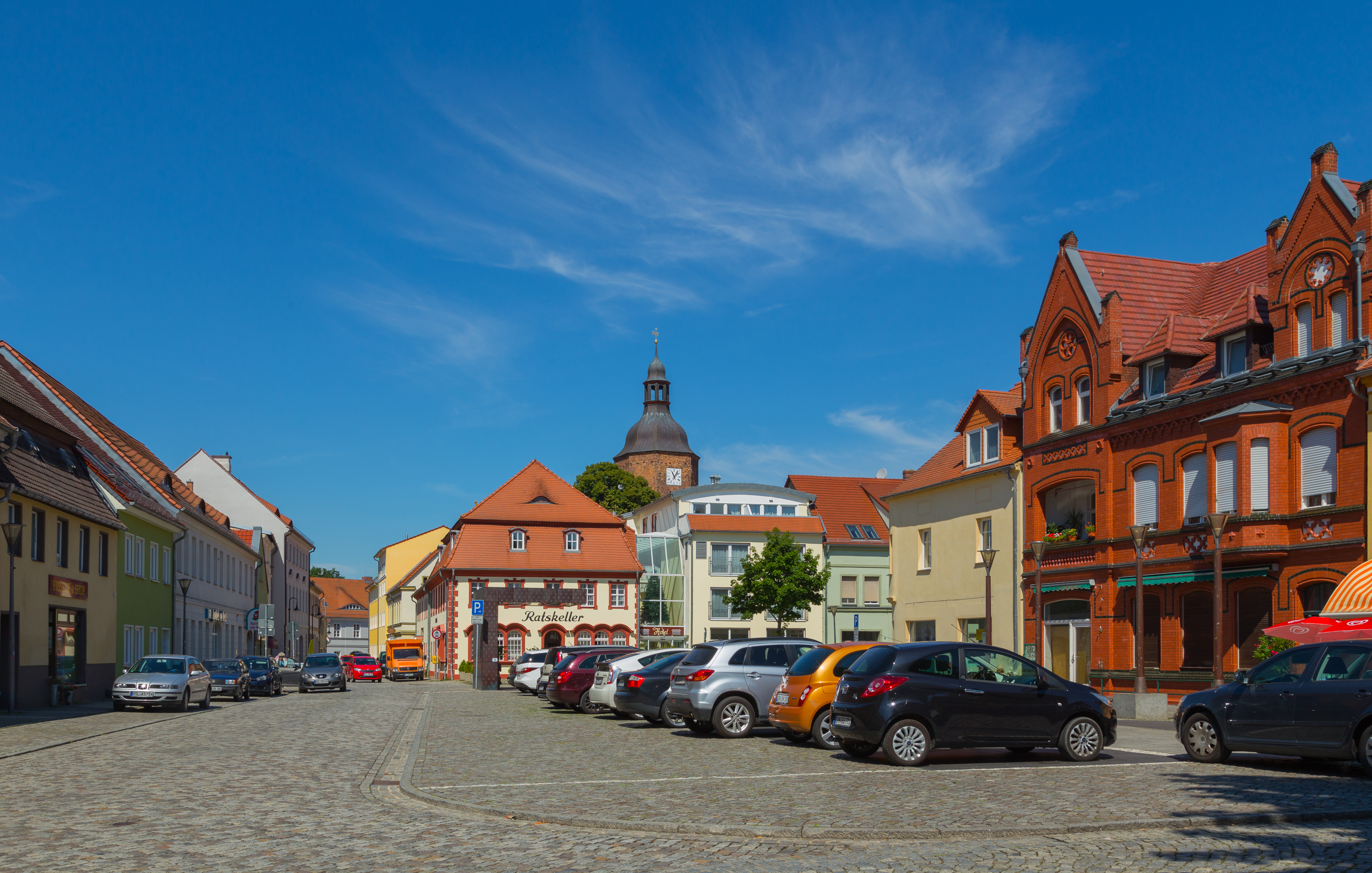
- Market Square

- Coat of arms

- Location of Vetschau within Oberspreewald-Lausitz district
- Interactive map of Vetschau
- Location within Germany Location within Brandenburg
- Coordinates: 51°46′59″N 14°04′00″E
- Country: Germany
- State: Brandenburg
- District: Oberspreewald-Lausitz
- Subdivisions: 10 Ortsteile

Government
  - Mayor (2017–25): Bengt Kanzler (CDU)

Area
  - Total: 111.51 km^{2} (43.05 sq mi)
- Elevation: 60 m (200 ft)

Population (2025-12-31)
  - Total: 7,533
  - Density: 67.55/km^{2} (175.0/sq mi)
- Demonym(s): German: Vetschauer; Lower Sorbian: Wětošowaŕ (m.), Wětošowaŕka (f.)
- Time zone: UTC+01:00 (CET)
  - Summer (DST): UTC+02:00 (CEST)
- Postal codes: 03226
- Dialling codes: 035433
- Vehicle registration: OSL
- Website: www.vetschau-online.de

Vetschau/Spreewald (German pronunciation: [ˈfɛtʃaʊ]; Lower Sorbian: Wětošow, pronounced [ˈwʲɪtɔʃɔw]; Polish: Wietoszów) is a town in the Oberspreewald-Lausitz district, in Lower Lusatia, Brandenburg, in eastern Germany. It is situated in the Spreewald, 18 kilometres (11 mi) west of Cottbus.

== History ==
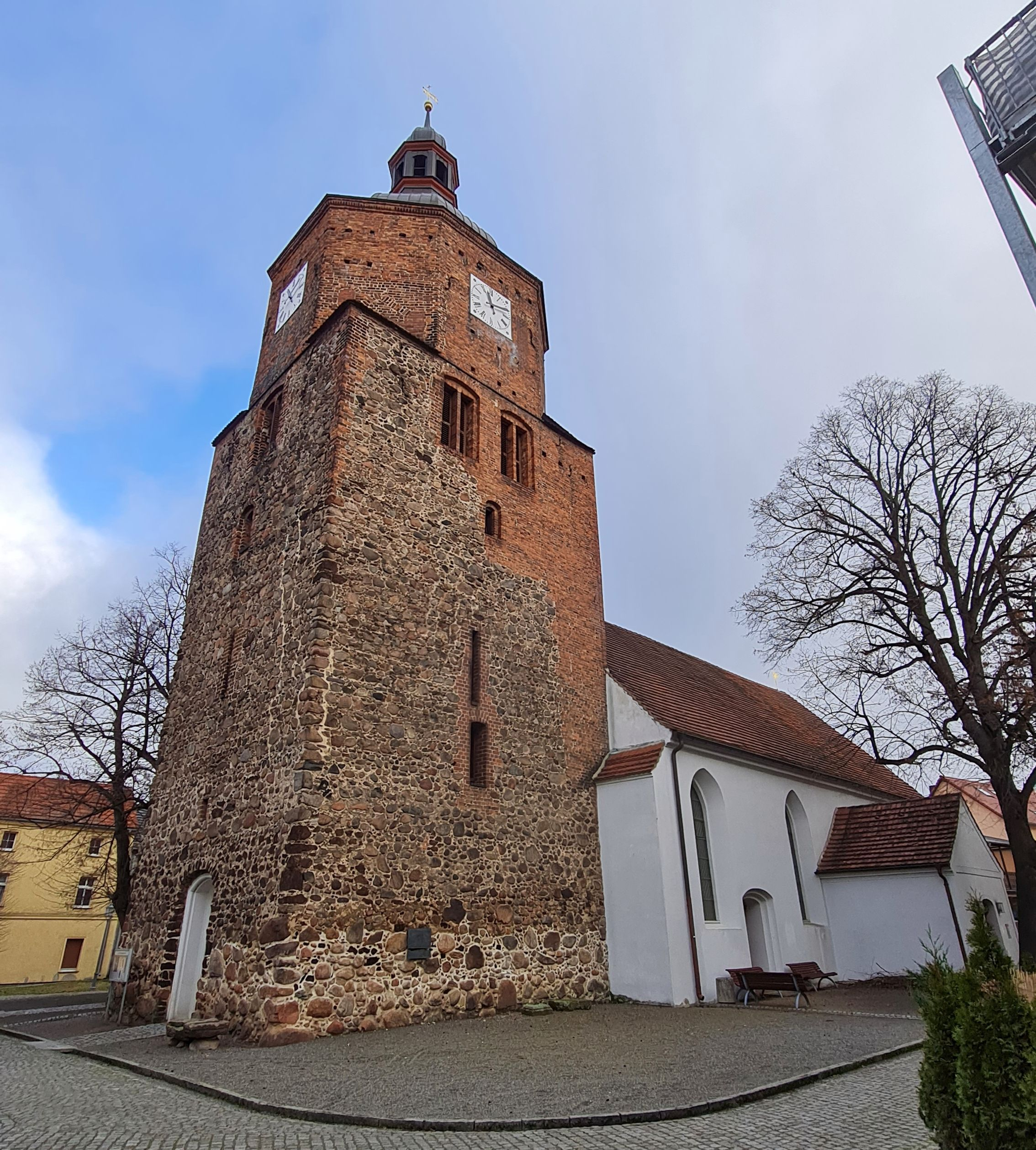
Sorbian-German church

Vetschau was first mentioned in 1302 as Veczicz. In the course of time, the name of the town changed from Vetczaw in 1434 via Fetzow in 1450 to Fetczaw in 1480. Along with Lower Lusatia, it passed to Hungary in 1469, then returned to Bohemia in 1490. In 1527 the town was first called Fetzscho, the formal town charter was granted to Vetschau in 1543. The coat of arms for Rath and Gmaind of Marckhts Vetzschew was issued to the town on 17 March 1548 by King Ferdinand I in Augsburg. The document was long lost and was rediscovered only in July 2005 in an attic in Vetschau. In 1635, the town passed from Bohemia to Saxony, and was part of Poland-Saxony from 1697 to 1763. In 1815, it was annexed by Prussia, and from 1871 formed part of the newly formed German Empire.

Until the late 19th century, most of the villages in the vicinity of Vetschau were predominantly Sorbian-speaking. The change of language to German took place here - accelerated by the abolition of Sorbian religious services and the enforcement of German in schools - essentially until the middle of the 20th century.

In the years 1929 to 1932, the Spreewald Folk and Traditional Costume Festivals took place here at the beginning of August. They were organized by the then mayor Otto Rohde and the Lower Sorbian scientific society Maśica Serbska in Cottbus.

Under Nazi Germany, it was the location of two forced labour subcamps of the Nazi prison for women in Cottbus.

From 1964 to 1996 Vetschau was the site of one of the largest lignite-fired power plants in the region, the Vetschau power plant. The power plant's chimneys were the city's landmarks, but also caused considerable sulfur dioxide pollution.

Vetschau belonged to the district of Calau from 1817 to 1952 (until 1947 in the Prussian province of Brandenburg, 1947-1952 in the state of Brandenburg). 1952-1993 the town was part of the district of Calau (until 1990 in the GDR Bezirk Cottbus, 1990-1993 again in the state of Brandenburg). Since the district reform in 1993, Vetschau has been located in the district of Oberspreewald-Lausitz.

With effect from 1 April 1997 the name of the city was changed to Vetschau/Spreewald.

== Demography ==
Development of population since 1875 within the current boundaries (blue line: population; dotted line: comparison to population development of Brandenburg state; grey background: time of Nazi rule; red background: time of communist rule)

Recent population development and projections (population development before the 2011 census (blue line); recent population development according to the Census in Germany in 2011 (blue bordered line); official projections for 2005-2030 (yellow line); for 2017-2030 (scarlet line); for 2020-2030 (green line)

Vetschau/Spreewald: Population development
within the current boundaries (2020)

Year	Pop.	±% p.a.
1875	7,243	—
1890	8,324	+0.93%
1910	8,254	−0.04%
1925	8,101	−0.12%
1939	7,929	−0.15%
1950	10,604	+2.68%
1964	11,938	+0.85%

Year	Pop.	±% p.a.
1971	13,286	+1.54%
1981	13,059	−0.17%
1985	12,728	−0.64%
1990	12,044	−1.10%
1995	11,170	−1.50%
2000	10,744	−0.77%
2005	9,616	−2.19%

Year	Pop.	±% p.a.
2010	8,770	−1.82%
2015	8,307	−1.08%
2016	8,297	−0.12%
2017	8,182	−1.39%
2018	8,103	−0.97%
2019	7,941	−2.00%
2020	7,862	−0.99%

== Politics ==
=== City Council ===
The Vetschau City Council consists of 18 members and the full-time mayor. The local elections on 26 May 2019 resulted in the following distribution of seats:

- CDU: 6
- AfD: 3
- SPD:3
- Wählergemeinschaft Ortsteile: 2
- Bündnis 90/Die Grünen: 2
- Die Linke: 2

=== Mayor ===
- 1994–2010: Axel Müller (SPD)
- since 2010: Bengt Kanzler

Kanzler was elected the new mayor of Vetschau on 29 November 2009 with 53.8% of the valid votes. He was confirmed in office for a further eight years in the mayoral election on 8 October 2017 with 51.7% of the valid votes.

== Buildings ==
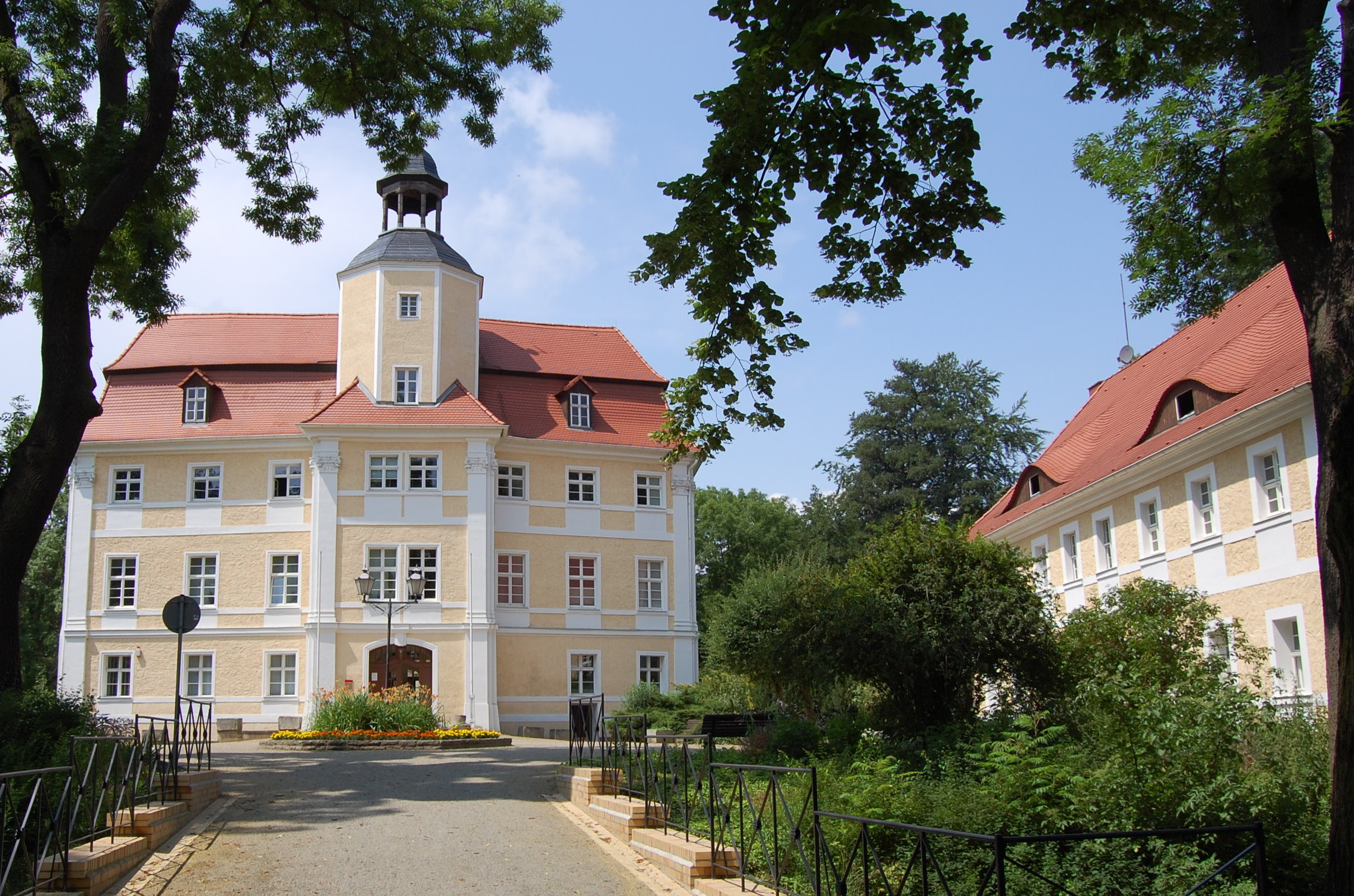
Vetschau castle

- At Vetschau, there is the Fuhrländer Wind Turbine Laasow, the former world's tallest wind turbine (until two slightly taller wind turbines opened in Poland in 2012), and the stork nest webcam installed by Naturschutzbund Niederlausitz.
- Wendish-German double church

== Sons and daughters of the town ==
- Richard Hellmann, (1876-1971), founder of Hellmann's Mayonnaise in the US, was born in Vetschau.
- Hans Stiebner (1898-1958), actor and theater director
