= Spree Forest =

Region in Brandenburg, Germany

Spree Forest Spreewald Błota
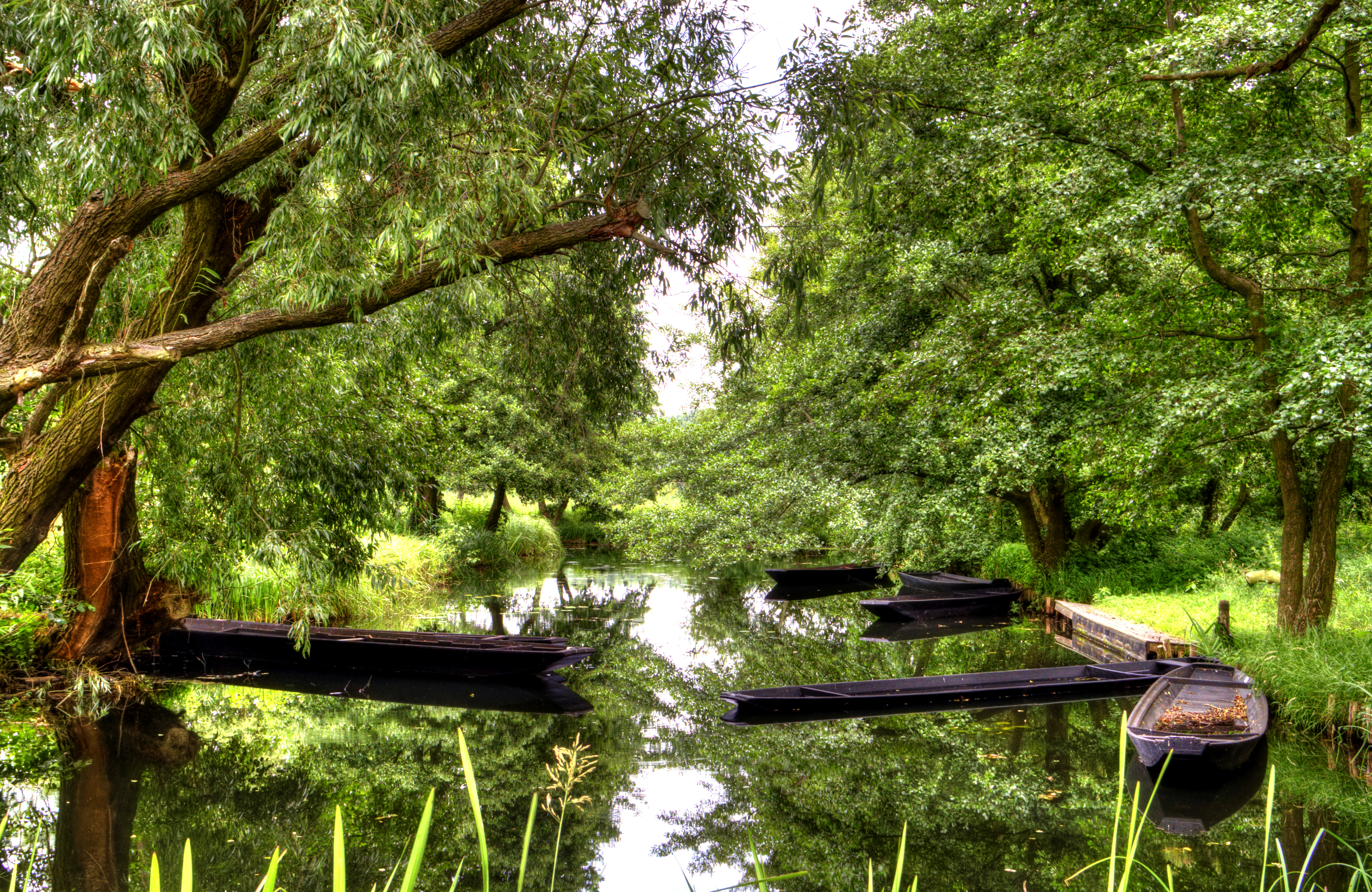
- The Spree Forest Biosphere Reserve
- Interactive map of Spree Forest; Spreewald; Błota
- Location: Brandenburg
- Coordinates: 51°54′50″N 13°55′35″E
- Designated: Biosphere reserve

The Spree Forest or Spreewald (German pronunciation: [ˈʃpʁeːˌvalt]; Lower Sorbian: Błota, pronounced [ˈbwɔta], i.e. 'the Swamps') is a large inland delta of the river Spree, and a historical cultural landscape located in the region of (Lower) Lusatia, in the state of Brandenburg, Germany, approximately 100 km southeast of Berlin and close to the city of Cottbus (L.S. Chóśebuz). Parts of the Spree Forest lie within the settlement area of the (Lower) Sorbs, where public signage is bilingual in German and Lower Sorbian.

As extensive floodplain and bog landscape, the Spree Forest was designated a biosphere reserve by UNESCO in 1991, called Biosphärenreservat Spreewald (biosferowy rezerwat Błota). It is known for its traditional irrigation system, consisting of more than 200 small canals (called Fließe; total length: 1,300 kilometres or 810 miles) within the 484-square-kilometre (187 sq mi) area, for its unique flora and fauna, and for its traditional flat-bottomed boats, the Spreewaldkähne. The landscape was shaped during the last Ice Age.

The region's most populous towns are Lübbenau/Spreewald (L.S. Lubnjow/Błota), which is known for the incorporated villages of Lehde (Lědy) and Leipe (Lipje), the villages with canals instead of streets, and Lübben (Spreewald) (Lubin (Błota)). Other notable towns are Vetschau/Spreewald (Wětošow/Błota) with its reconstructed Old Slavic fortified wooden settlement (gord) Slawenburg Raddusch (Radušańske słowjańske groźišćo), and Burg (Spreewald) (Bórkowy (Błota)).

== Overview ==
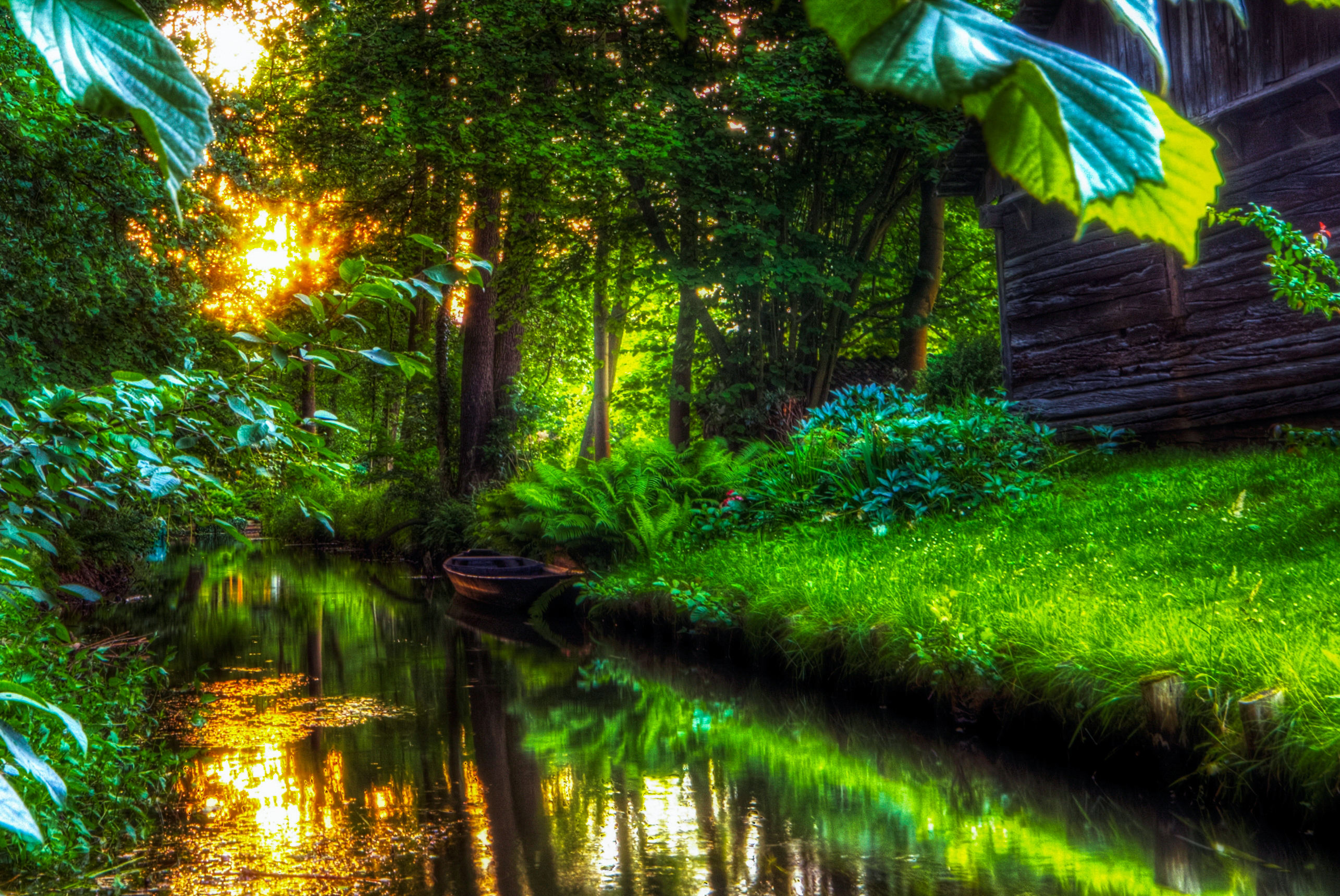
A Spree Forest Canal (Spreewaldfließ)

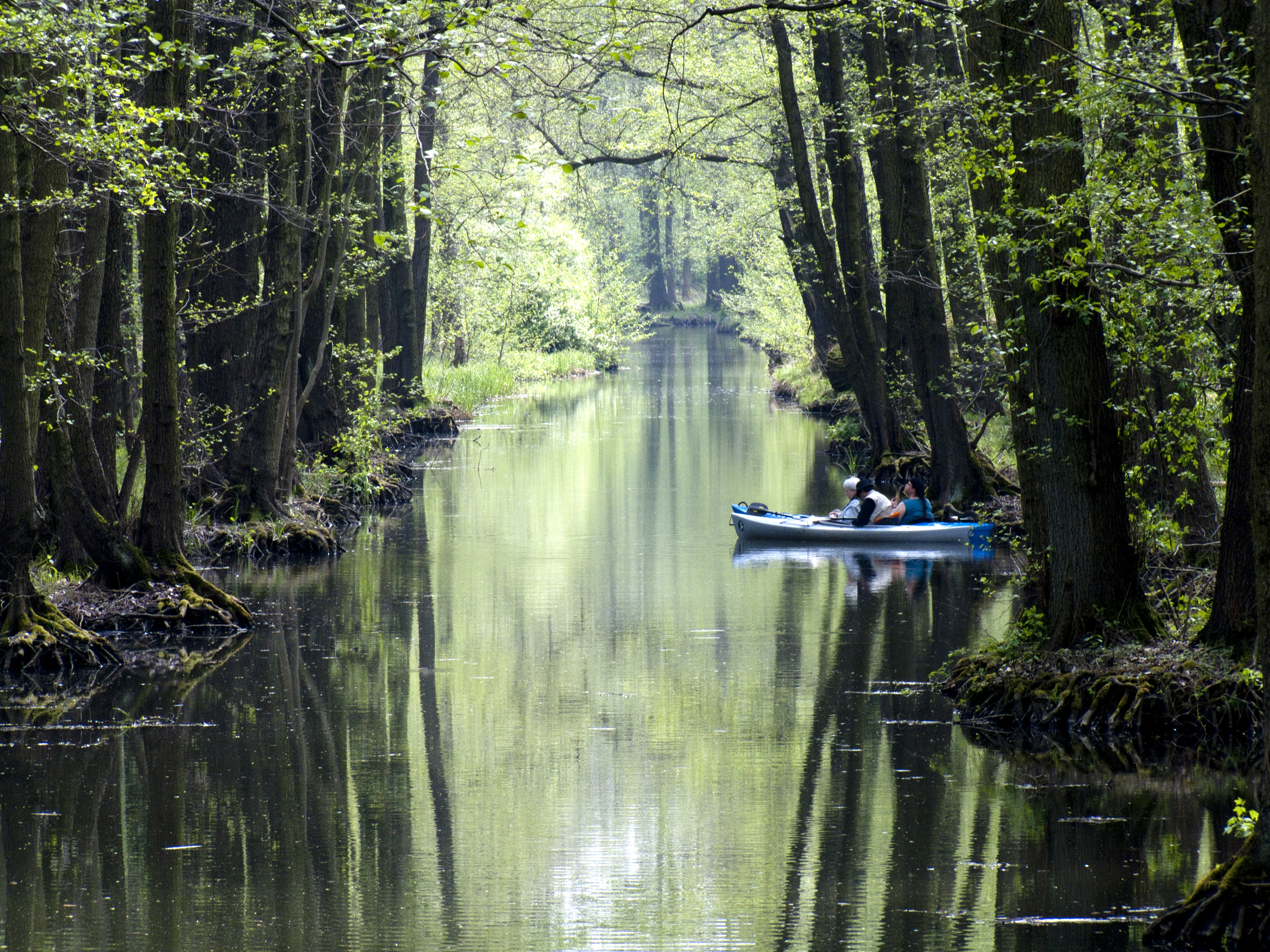
Spreewaldfließ

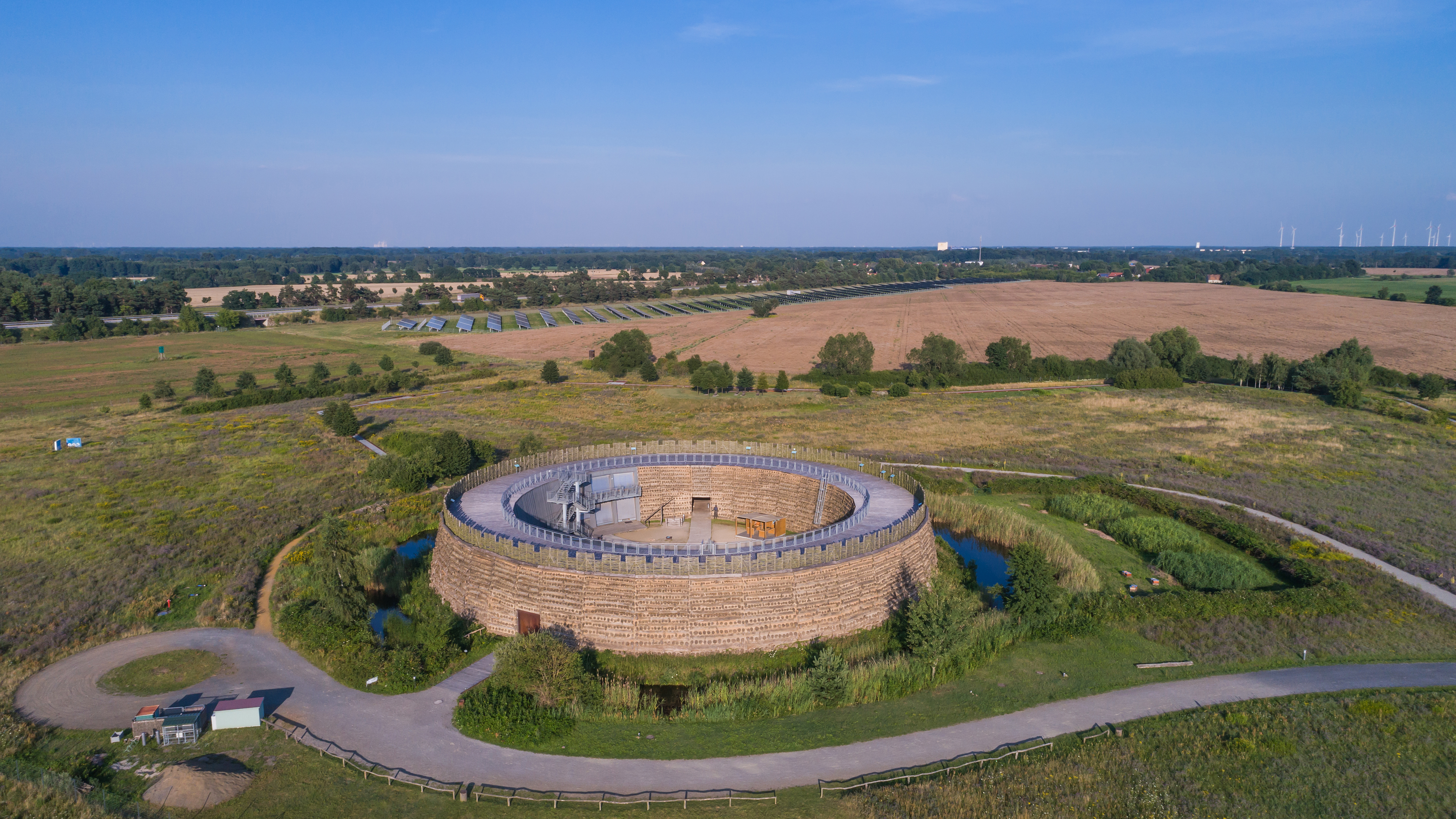
Slavic gord Raddusch (in German: Slawenburg Raddusch In Lower Sorbian: Radušańske słowjańske groźišćo) at Vetschau-Raddusch

Approximately 50,000 people live in the biosphere reserve (1998). Many of them are descendants of the first settlers in the Spree Forest region, the Slavic tribes of the Sorbs and Wends. They have preserved their traditional language, customs, and clothing to this day.

Most inhabitants depend on tourism. Many tourists explore the Spree Forest in punts. Agriculture, forestry, and fishery are other important sources of income. The principal town of the area is Lübbenau.

The Spree Forest gave its name to the following German districts:

- Dahme-Spreewald
- Oberspreewald-Lausitz

== Landscape and nature ==
Alder forests on wetlands and pine forests on sandy dry areas are characteristic of the Spree Forest region. Grasslands and fields may be found as well. Approximately 18,000 species of flora and fauna have been identified in the region. In 1991, the Spree Forest was designated a UNESCO "Biosphärenreservat" (Man and Biosphere Reserve Programme).

== Economy ==
The Spree Forest is a tourist destination, and a centre of production of natural organic products. The tourism and economic demarcation of the Spree Forest is thus much more difficult than its geographical extension. Due to its popularity and the associated advantage, the borders of the Spree Forest tourism and business area have increasingly extended beyond the original bounds of the Spree Forest. This is particularly true of the regional food industry, as the Spree Forest economic area created for this industry (famed in Germany for the Spreewald gherkin and other pickles) is much larger than the ecological Spree Forest. This economic area is protected by the Protected Geographical Indication scheme of the European Union (EU). Before the legal protection of the region there were several court disputes over the designation Spree Forest on food labels.

== Map ==
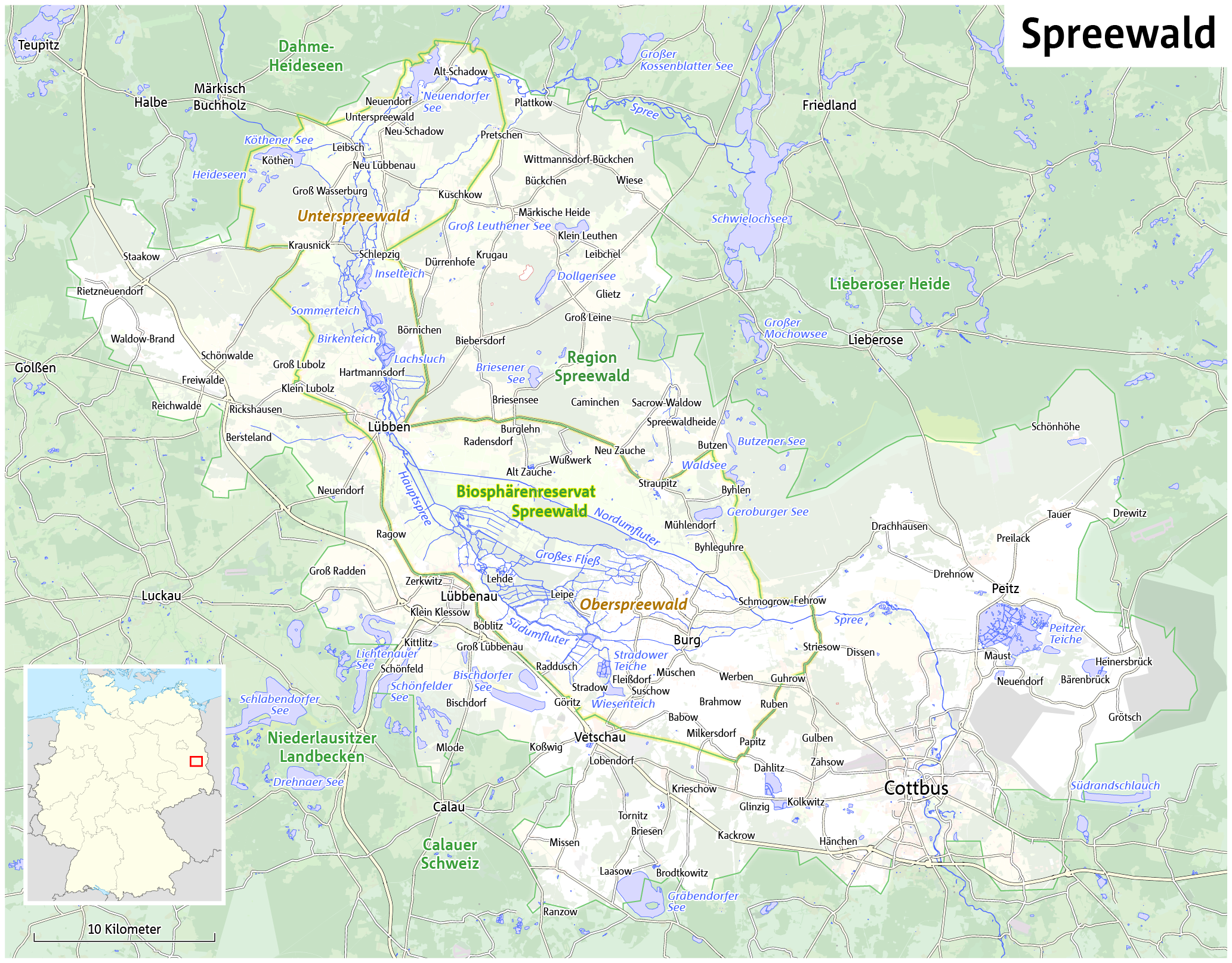
Map of the Spreewald area, in German

== Gallery ==
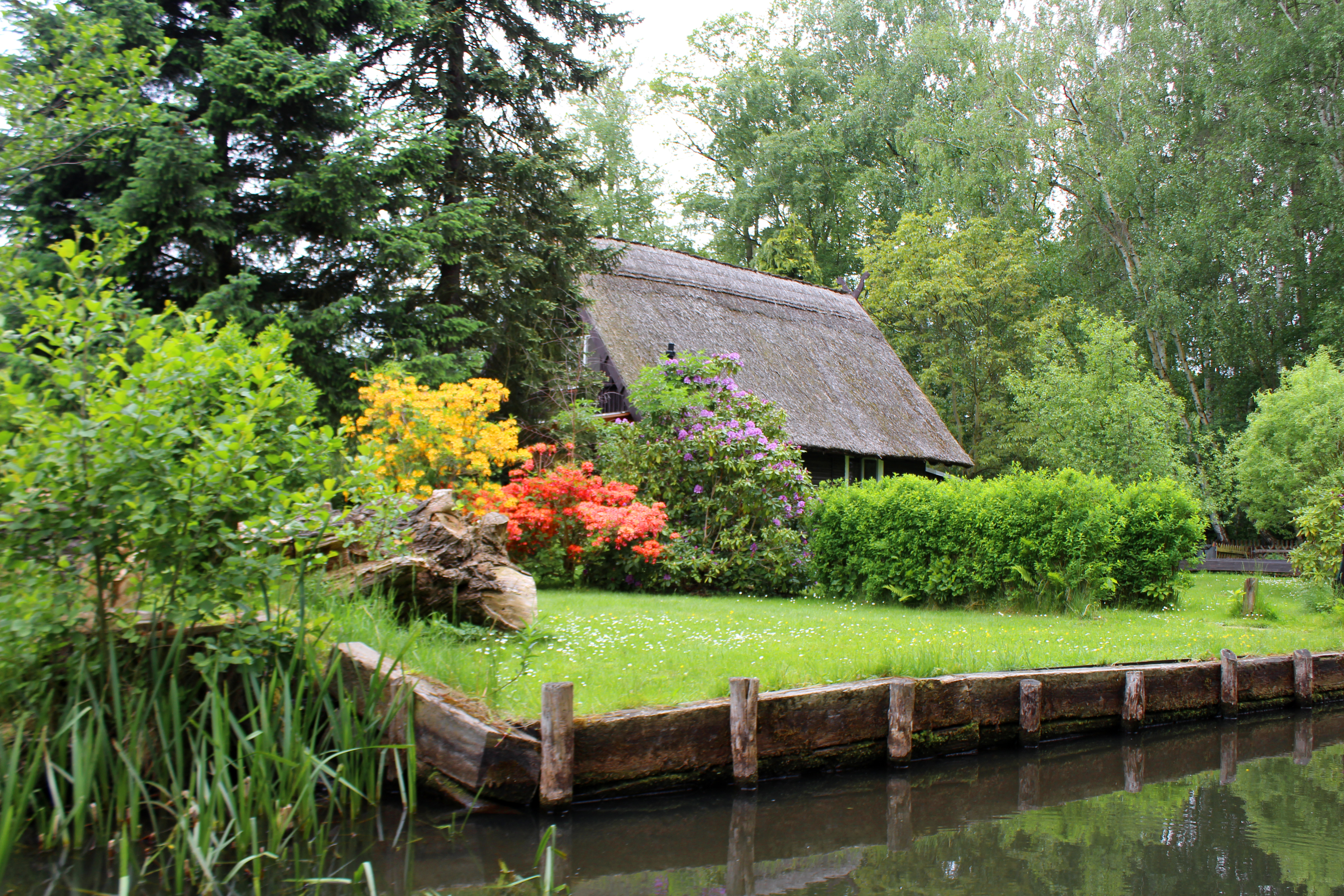
Spring in the Spree Forest (Lübbenau-Lehde/Lubnjow-Lědy)

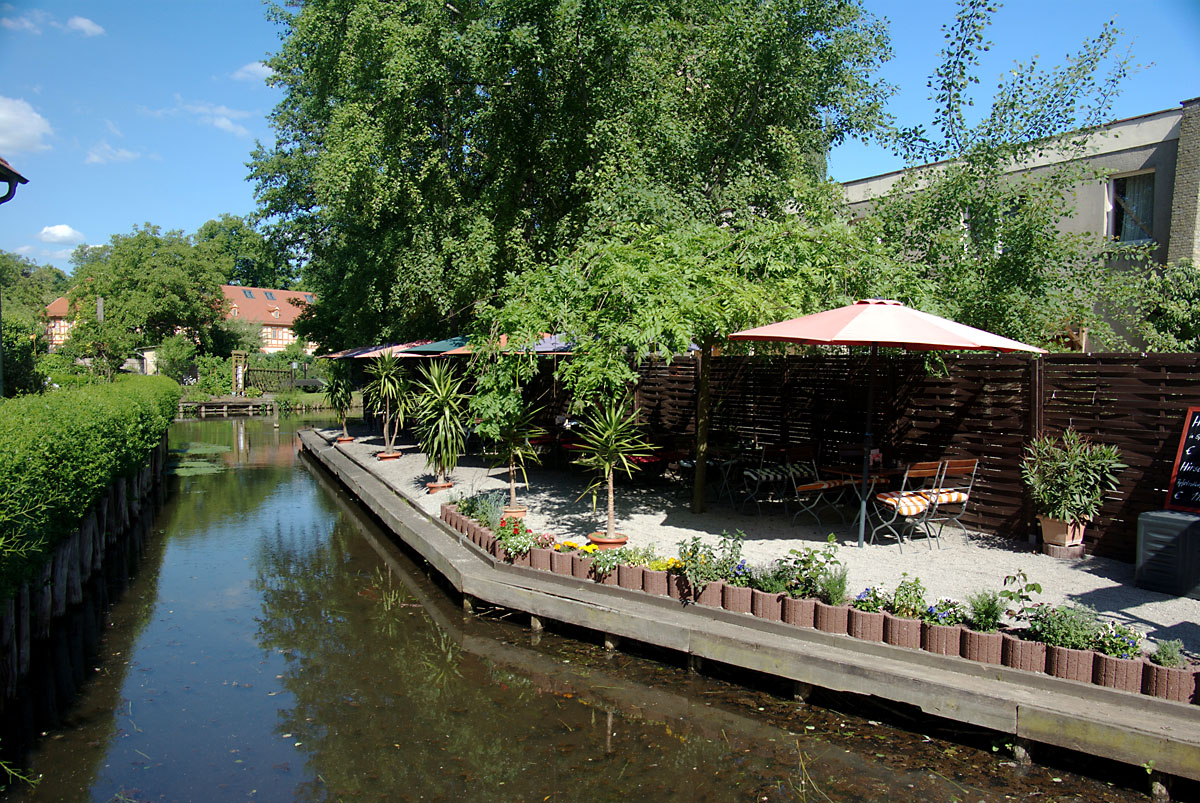
Beer garden in Lübbenau

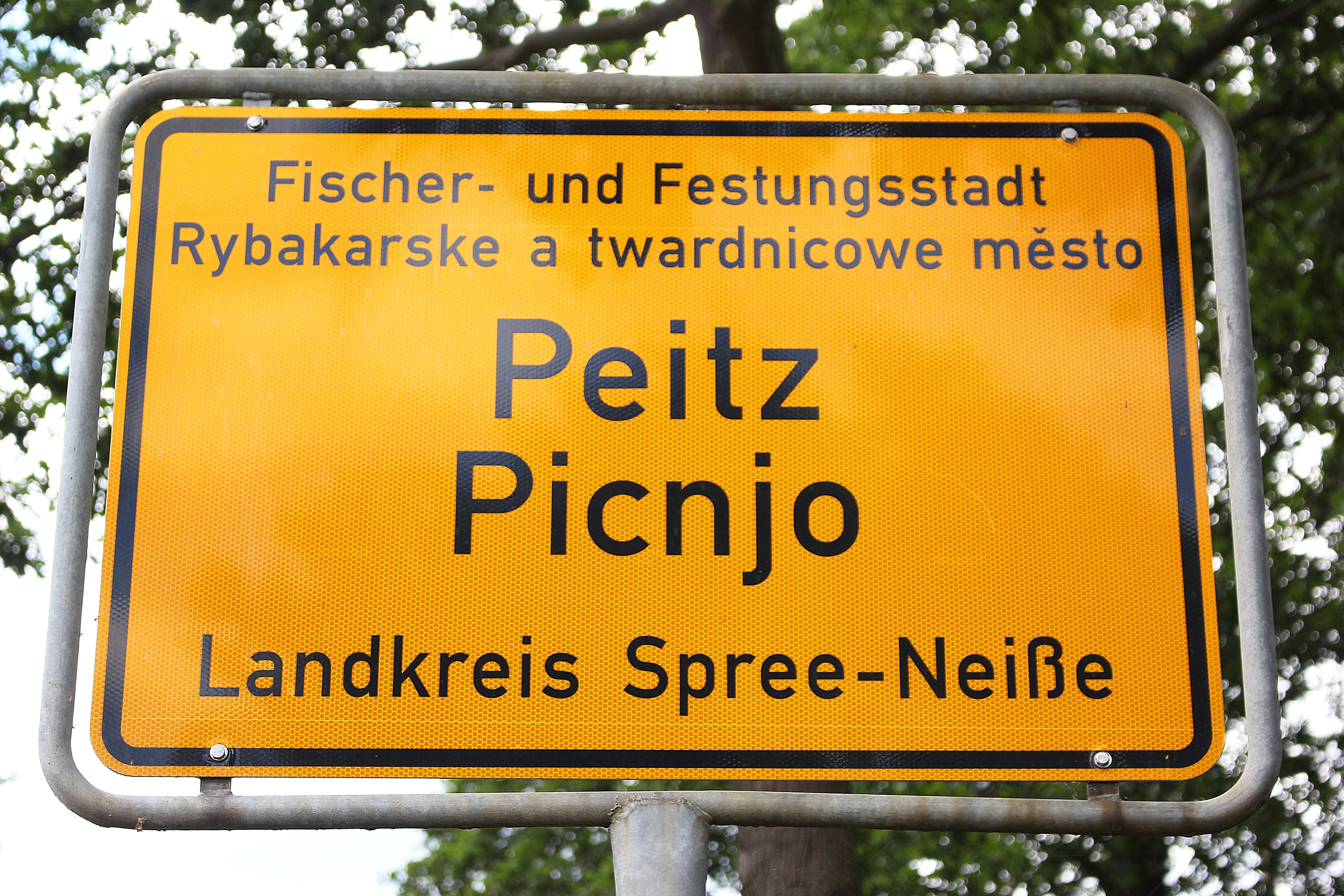
Fishermen and fortification city of Peitz

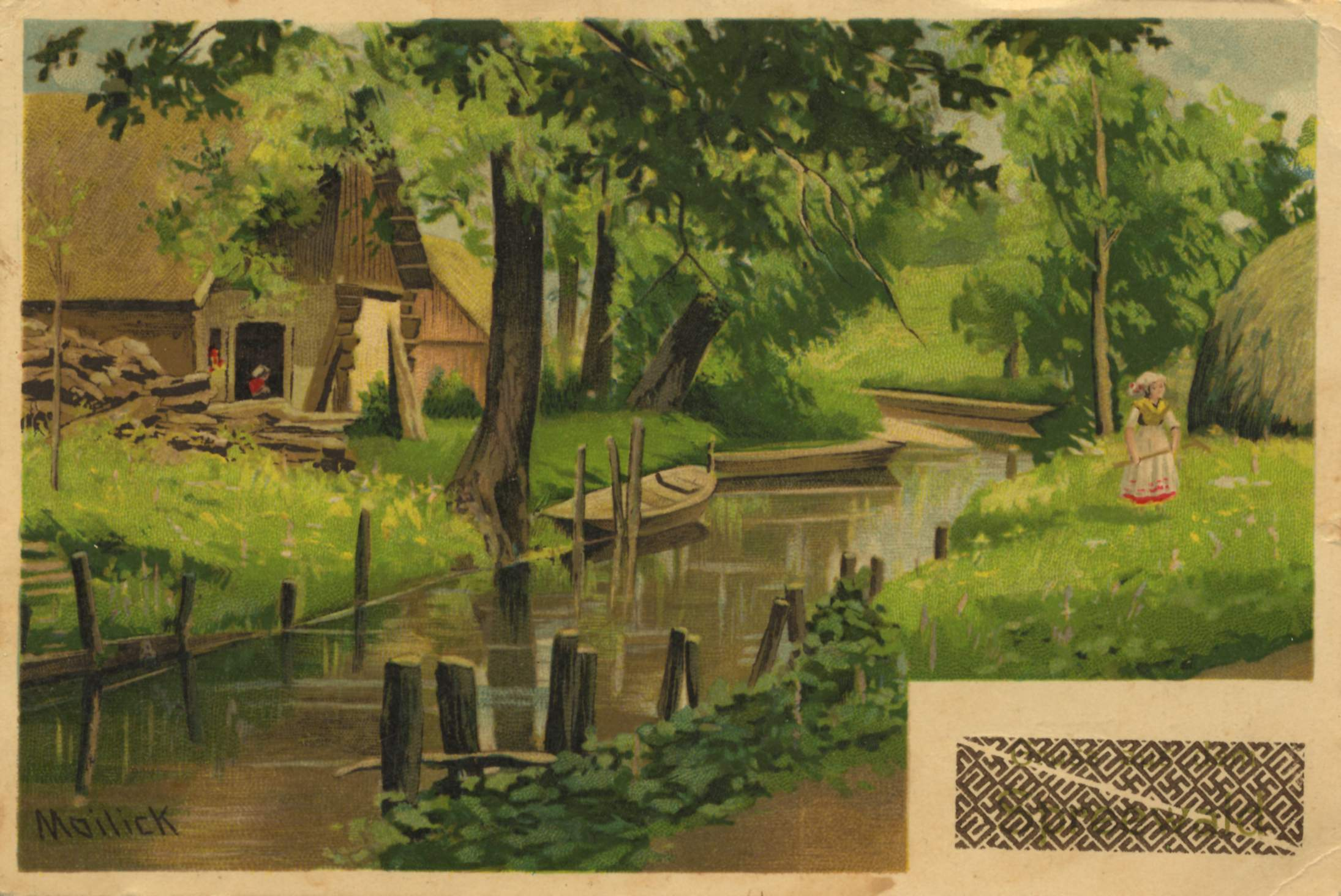
1900 Spree Forest postcard

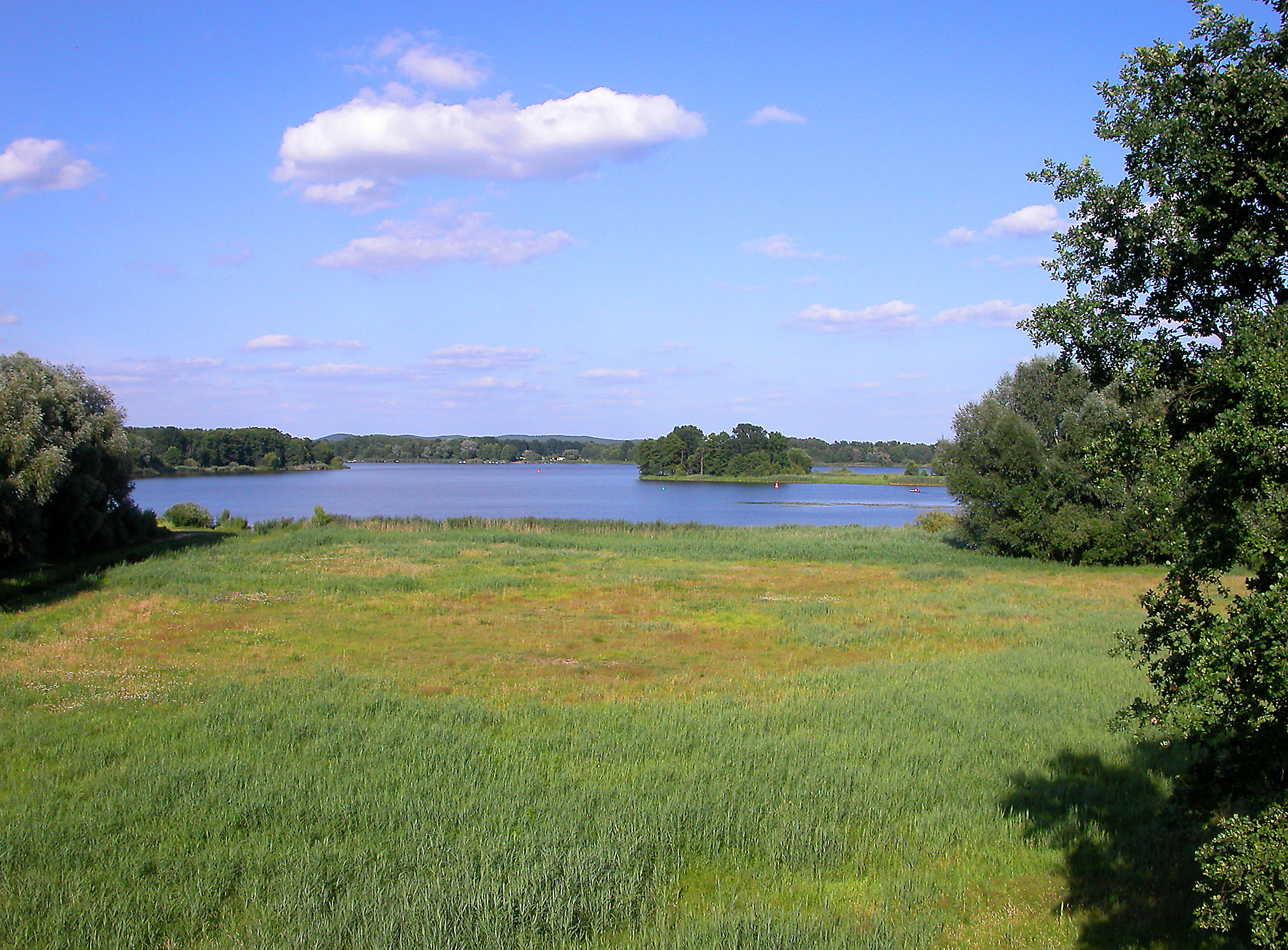
Neuendorfer See seen from Neuendorf am See (Nowa Wjas pśi jazoru)

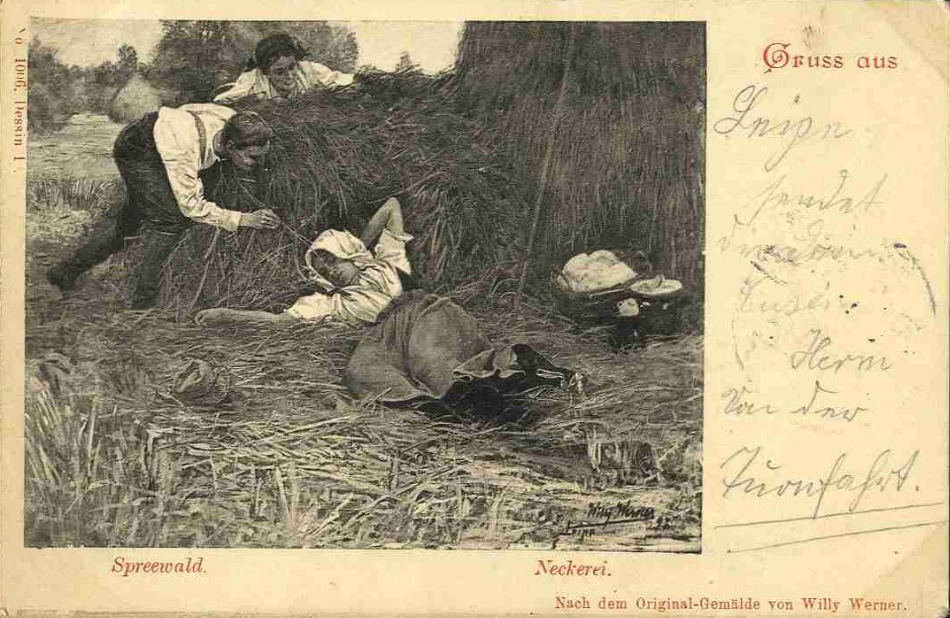
Tourism in the Spree Forest: 1902 postcard "Neckerei" (teasing)

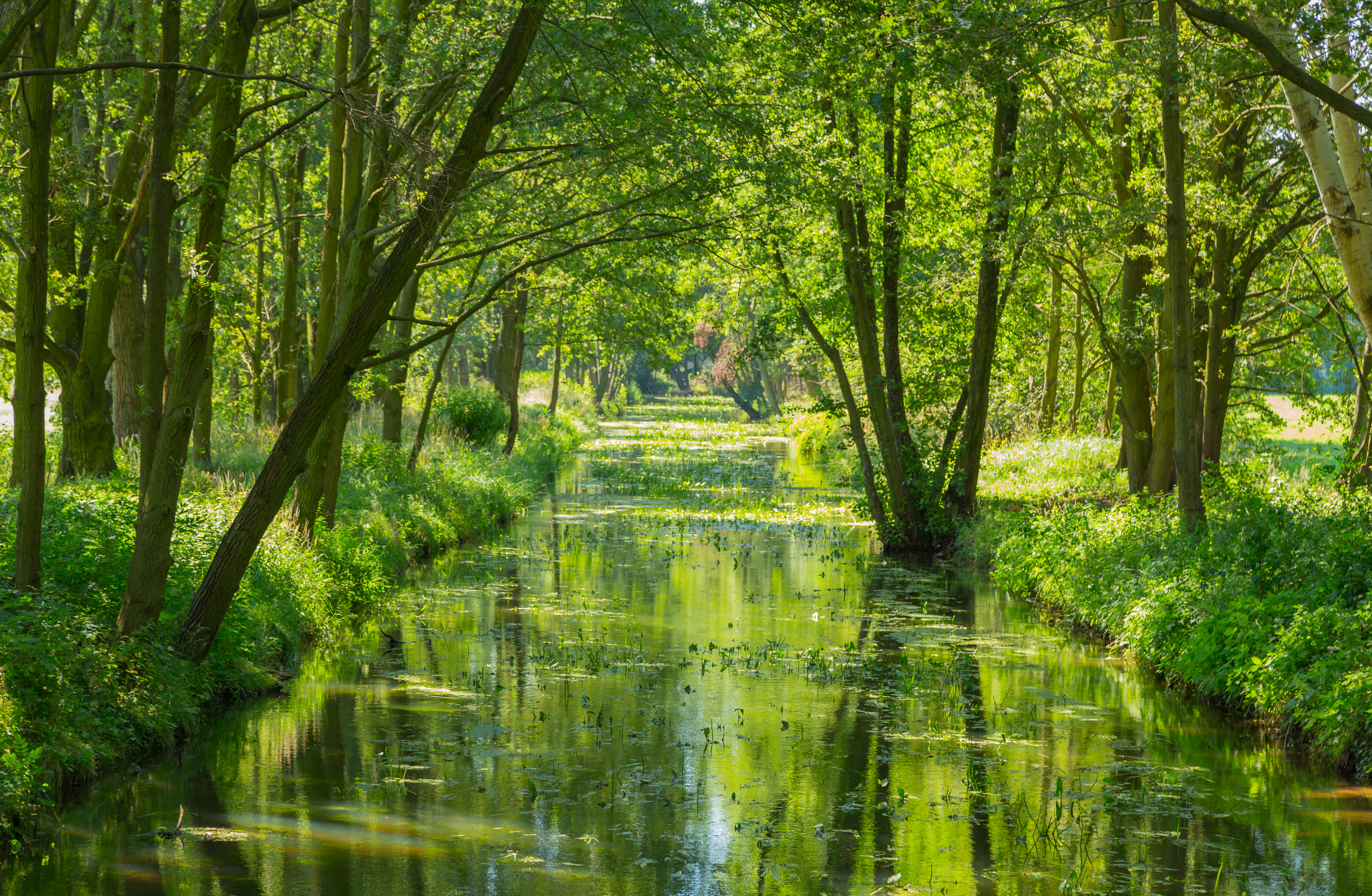
Greifenhainer Fließ (Greifenhain Canal) at Kolkwitz-Babow (Gołkojce-Bobow)

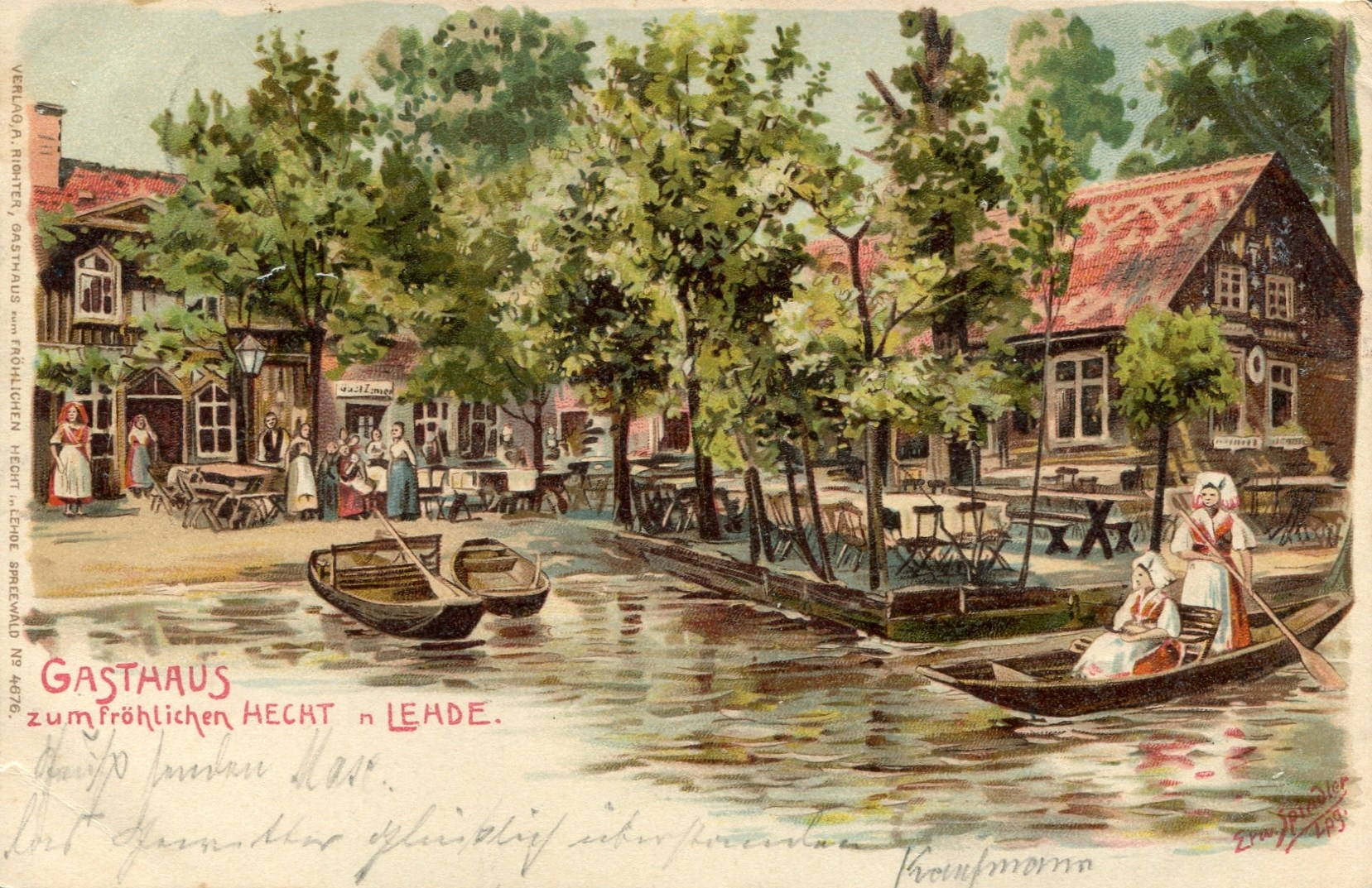
Gasthaus "Zum fröhlichen Hecht" (Inn "To the happy pike") in Lübbenau-Lehde

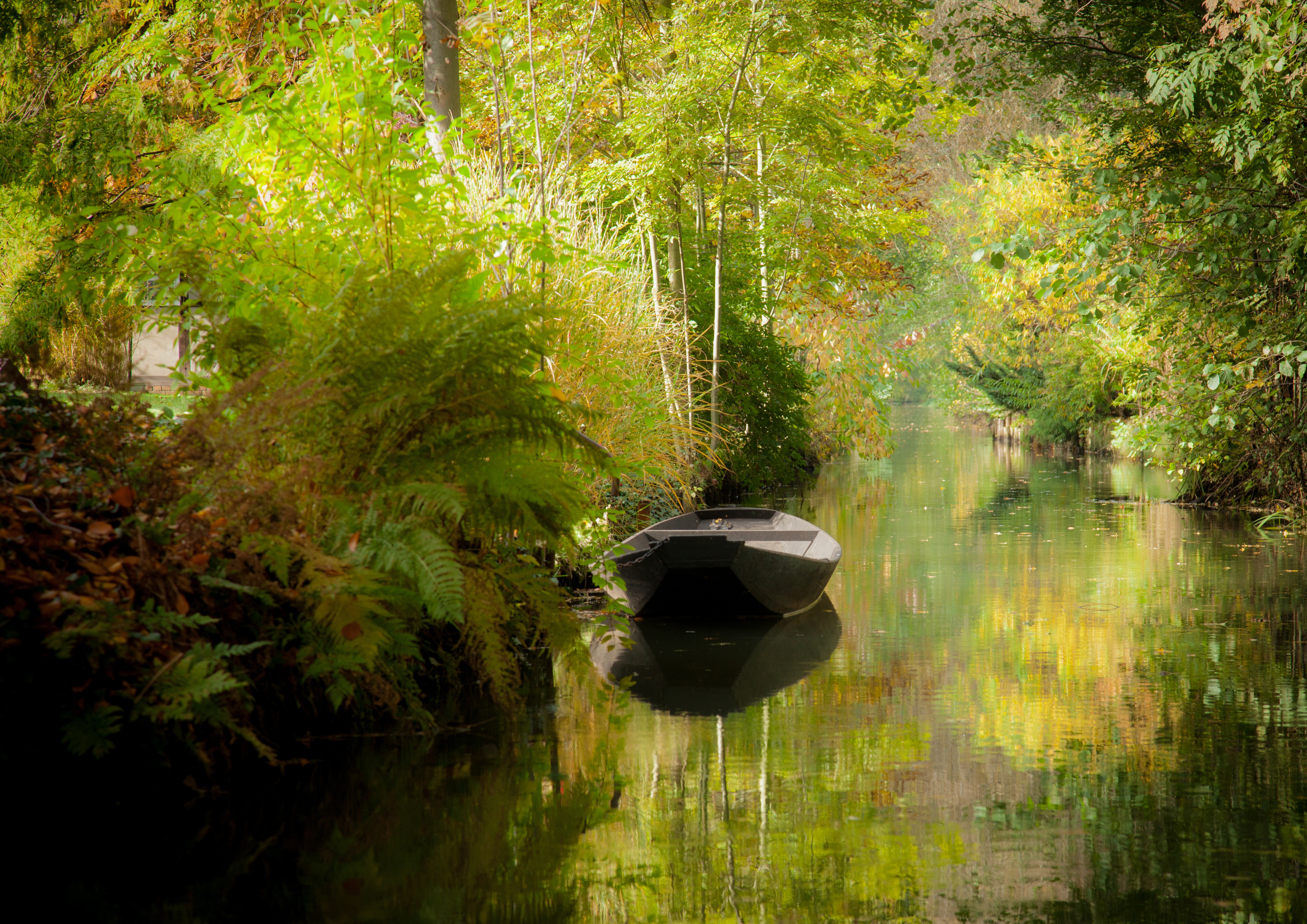
Autumn in the Spree Forest (Burg (Spreewald)/Bórkowy (Błota))

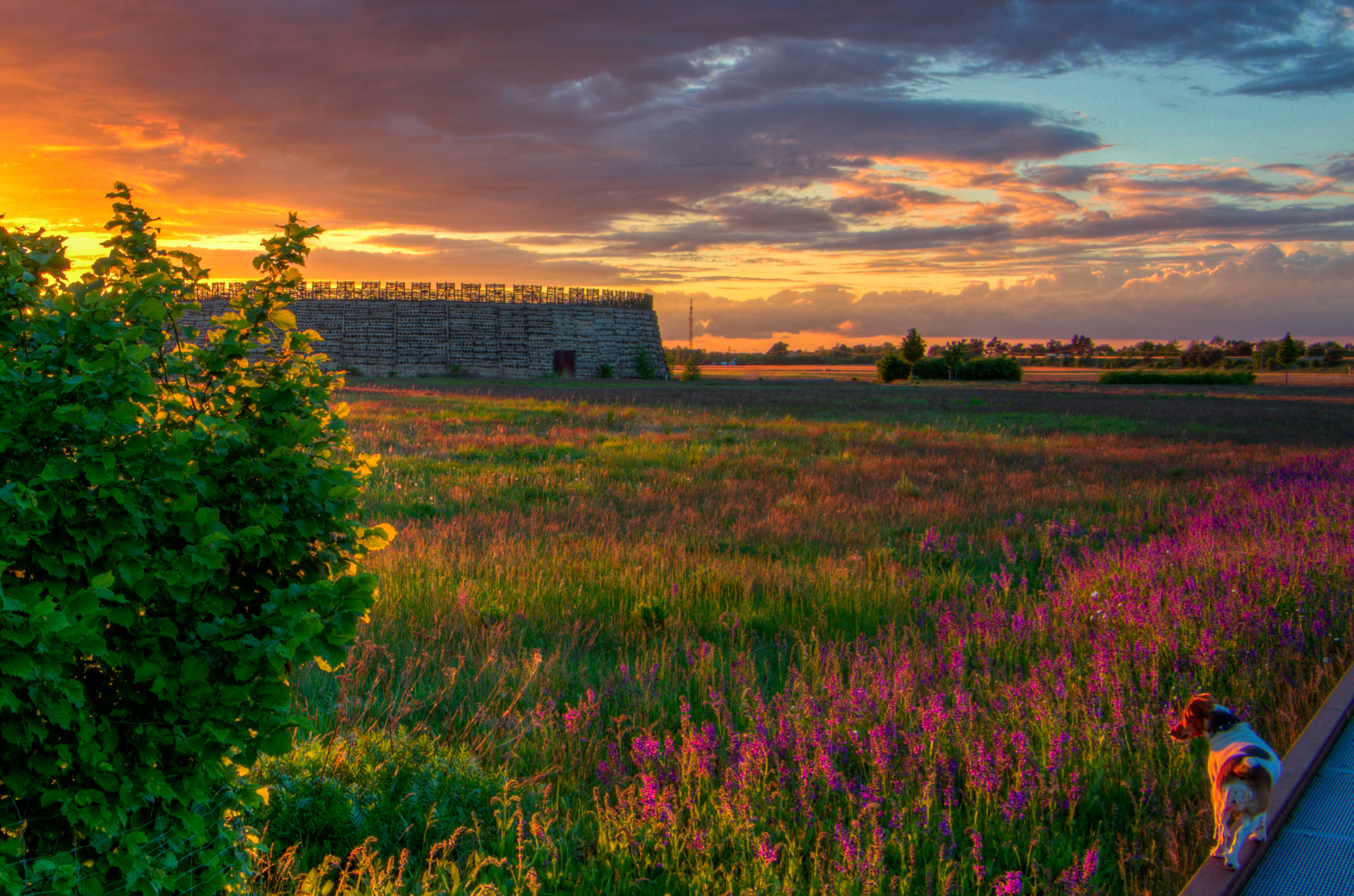
Slavic gord Raddusch in Vetschau-Raddusch (Wětošow-Raduš)

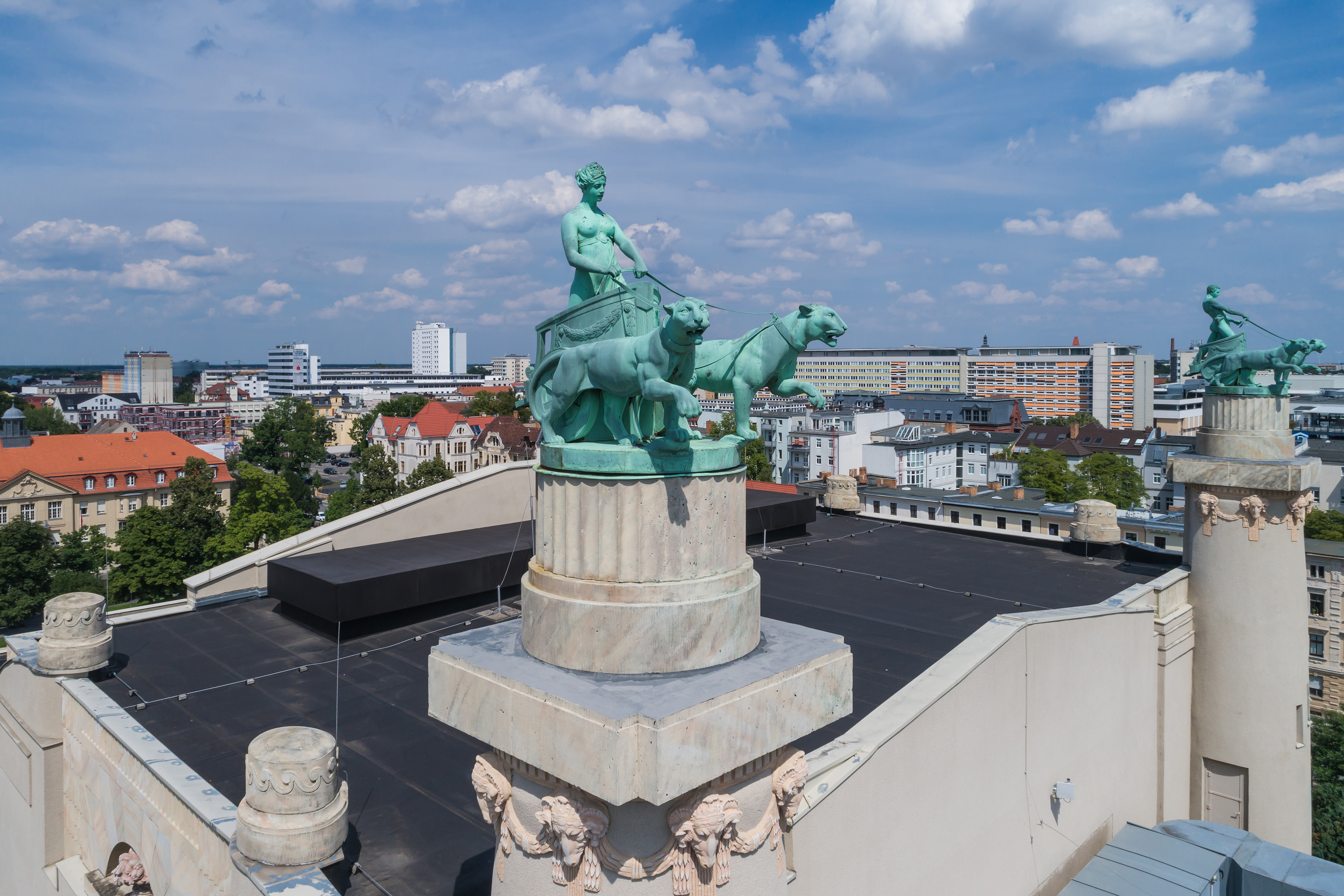
Cottbus (Chóśebuz), largest city in the region

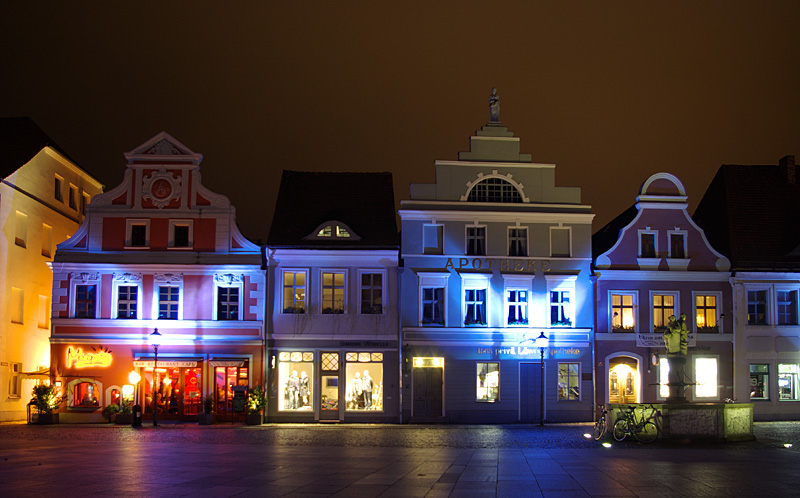
Cottbus Old Market Square (Altmarkt/Stare Wiki)

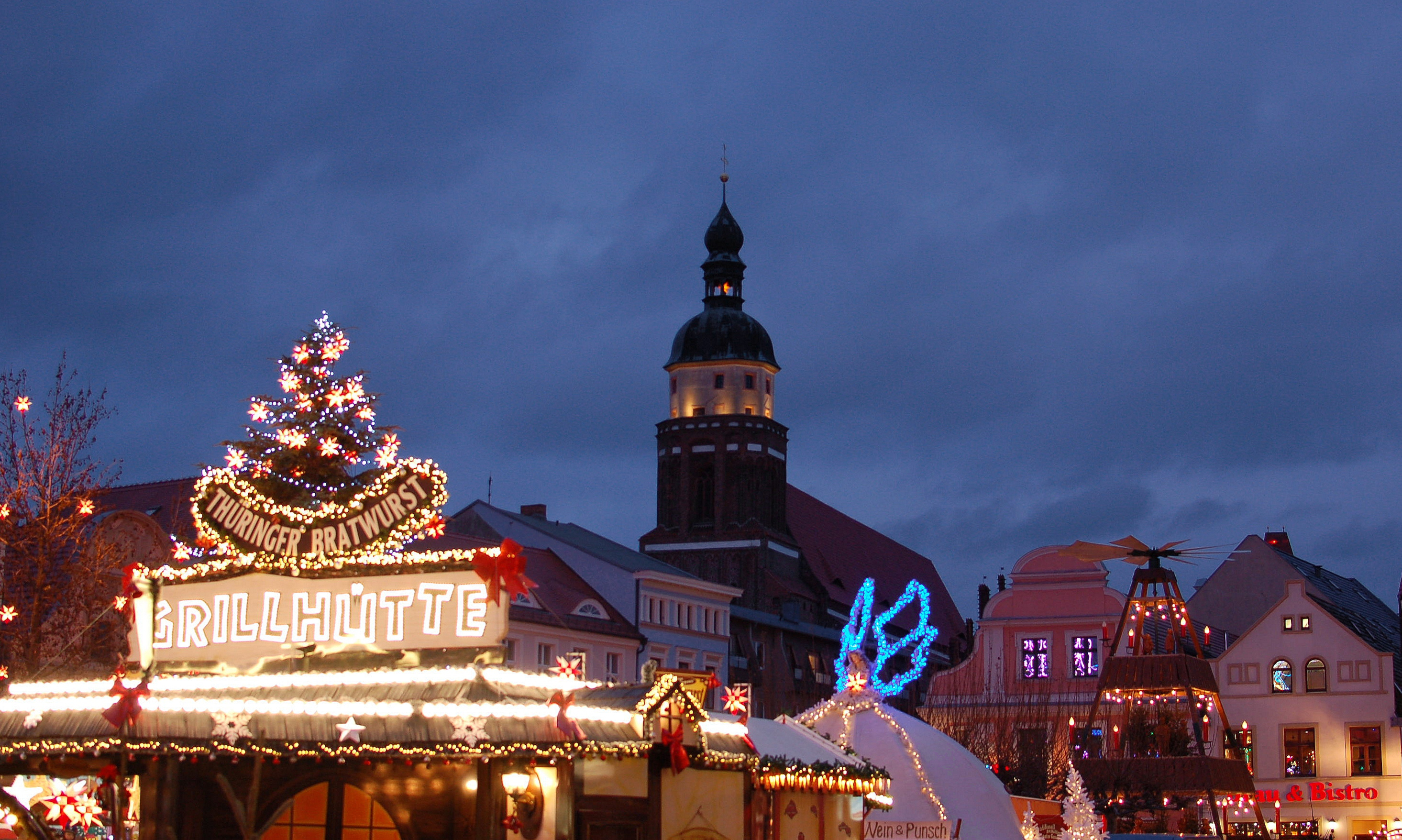
Cottbus Christmas Market

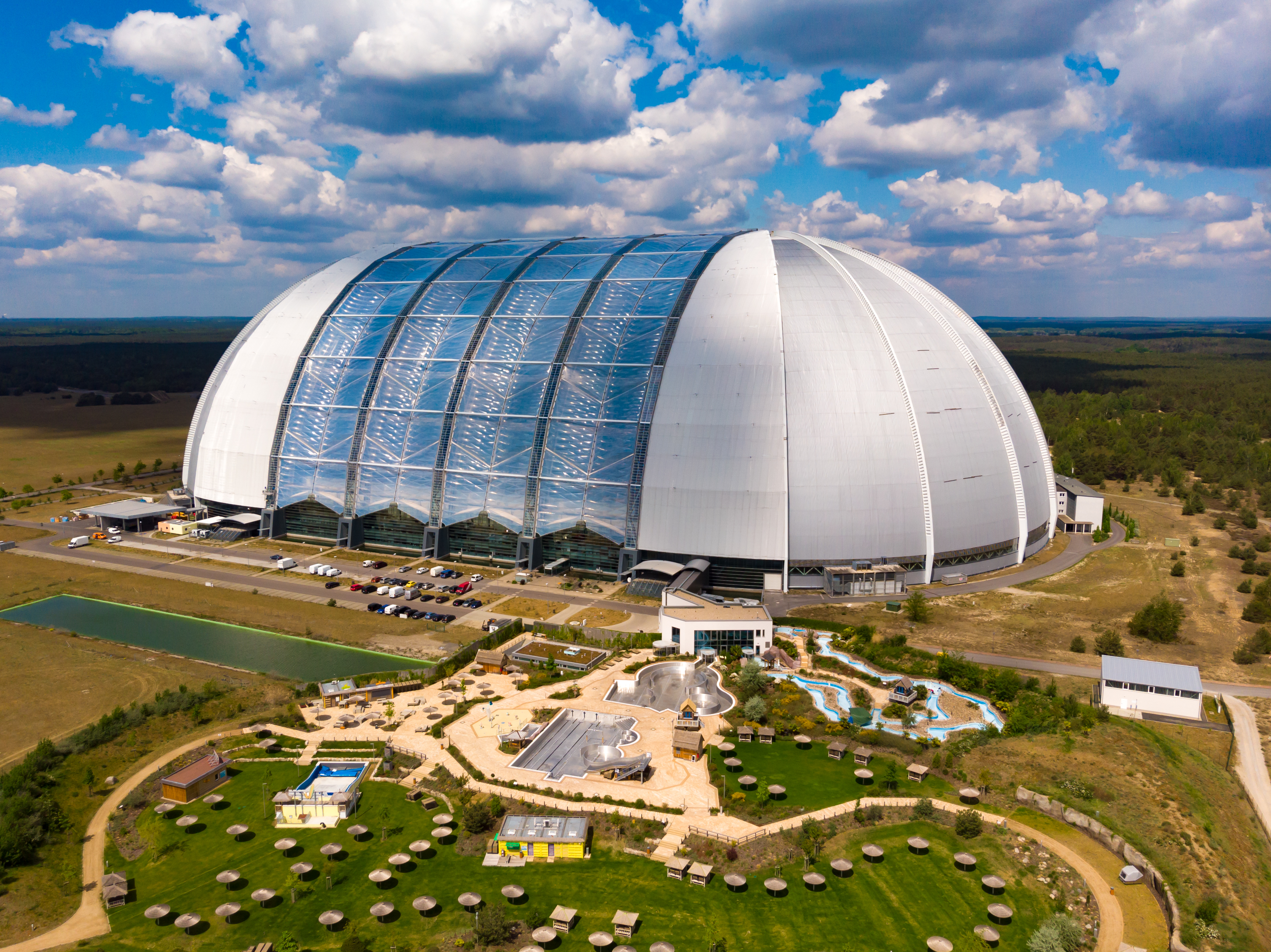
The Tropical Islands Resort is partly located within the municipal boundaries of Krausnick-Groß Wasserburg (Kšušwica-Wódowy Grod), Amt Unterspreewald (Dolne Błota)

== See also ==
- Spreewald gherkins
